The lists of birds in the light blue box below are divided by biological family. The lists are based on The AOS Check-list of North American Birds of the American Ornithological Society and The Clements Checklist of Birds of the World supplemented with checklists from Panama, Greenland, and Bermuda . It includes the birds of Greenland, Canada, the United States (excluding Hawaii), Mexico, Central America, Bermuda, and the West Indies.

Taxonomy
The taxonomic treatment (designation and sequence of orders, families and species) and nomenclature (common and scientific names) used in the accompanying bird lists adheres to the conventions of the AOS's (2019) Check-list of North American Birds, the recognized scientific authority on the taxonomy and nomenclature of North America birds. The AOS's Committee on Classification and Nomenclature, the body responsible for maintaining and updating the Check-list, "strongly and unanimously continues to endorse the biological species concept (BSC), in which species are considered to be genetically cohesive groups of populations that are reproductively isolated from other such groups" (AOS 2019). The Sibley-Ahlquist taxonomy is an alternative phylogenetic arrangement based on DNA-DNA hybridization.

Unless otherwise noted, all species listed below are considered to occur regularly in North America as permanent residents, summer or winter residents or visitors, or migrants.  The following codes are used to denote certain categories of species:

(A) = Accidental occurrence based on one or two (rarely more) records, and unlikely to occur regularly.
(E) = Extinct; a recent member of the avifauna that no longer exists.
(Ex) = Extirpated; no longer occurs in area of interest, but other populations still exist elsewhere.
(I) = Introduced population established solely as result of direct or indirect human intervention; synonymous with non-native and non-indigenous.

Conservation status - IUCN Red List of Threatened Species:
 - Extinct,  - Extinct in the Wild
 - Critically Endangered,  - Endangered,  - Vulnerable
 - Near Threatened,  - Least Concern
(v. 2019, the data is current as of July 25, 2019
and Endangered Species Act:
 - endangered,  - threatened
,  - experimental non essential or essential population
,  - endangered or threatened due to similarity of appearance
(including taxa not necessarily found in the USA, the data is current as of March 28, 2014

Tinamous
Order: TinamiformesFamily: Tinamidae

The tinamous are one of the most ancient groups of bird. Although they look similar to other ground-dwelling birds like quail and grouse, they have no close relatives and are classified as a single family, Tinamidae, within their own order, the Tinamiformes. They are related to the ratites (order Struthioniformes), which includes the rheas, emus, and kiwis.

Highland tinamou, Nothocercus bonapartei 
Great tinamou, Tinamus major 
Little tinamou, Crypturellus soui 
Thicket tinamou, Crypturellus cinnamomeus 
Slaty-breasted tinamou, Crypturellus boucardi 
Choco tinamou, Crypturellus kerriae

Screamers
Order: AnseriformesFamily: Anhimidae

The screamers are a small family of birds related to the ducks. They are large, bulky birds, with a small downy head, long legs, and large feet which are only partially webbed. They have large spurs on their wings which are used in fights over mates and in territorial disputes.

Northern screamer, Chauna chavaria (A)

Ducks, geese, and waterfowl

Order: AnseriformesFamily: Anatidae

The family Anatidae includes the ducks and most duck-like waterfowl, such as geese and swans. These birds are adapted to an aquatic existence with webbed feet, flattened bills, and feathers that are excellent at shedding water due to special oils.

White-faced whistling-duck, Dendrocygna viduata 
Black-bellied whistling-duck, Dendrocygna autumnalis 
West Indian whistling-duck, Dendrocygna arborea 
Fulvous whistling-duck, Dendrocygna bicolor 
Emperor goose, Anser canagicus 
Snow goose, Anser caerulescens 
Ross's goose, Anser rossii 
Graylag goose, Anser anser (A) 
Greater white-fronted goose, Anser albifrons 
Lesser white-fronted goose, Anser erythropus (A) 
Taiga bean-goose, Anser fabalis (A)  
Tundra bean-goose, Anser serrirostris (A)
Pink-footed goose, Anser brachyrhynchus (C) 
Brant, Branta bernicla 
Barnacle goose, Branta leucopsis (C) 
Cackling goose, Branta hutchinsii 
Canada goose, Branta canadensis 
Mute swan, Cygnus olor (I) 
Trumpeter swan, Cygnus buccinator 
Tundra swan, Cygnus columbianus 
Whooper swan, Cygnus cygnus (A) 
Comb duck, Sarkidiornis sylvicola 
Orinoco goose, Neochen jubata (A) 
Egyptian goose, Alopochen aegyptiaca  (I) 
Common shelduck, Tadorna tadorna (A) 
Ruddy shelduck, Tadorna ferruginea (A) 
Muscovy duck, Cairina moschata 
Wood duck, Aix sponsa 
Baikal teal, Sibirionetta formosa (A) 
Garganey, Spatula querquedula (A) 
Blue-winged teal, Spatula discors 
Cinnamon teal, Spatula cyanoptera 
Northern shoveler, Spatula clypeata 
Gadwall, Mareca strepera 
Falcated duck, Mareca falcata (A) 
Eurasian wigeon, Mareca penelope (C) 
American wigeon, Mareca americana 
Eastern spot-billed duck, Anas zonorhyncha (A) 
Mallard, Anas platyrhynchos 
Mexican duck, Anas diazi
American black duck, Anas rubripes 
Mottled duck, Anas fulvigula 
White-cheeked pintail, Anas bahamensis 
Northern pintail, Anas acuta 
Green-winged teal, Anas crecca 
Canvasback, Aythya valisineria 
Redhead, Aythya americana 
Common pochard, Aythya ferina (A) 
Ring-necked duck, Aythya collaris 
Tufted duck, Aythya fuligula 
Greater scaup, Aythya marila 
Lesser scaup, Aythya affinis 
Steller's eider, Polysticta stelleri  
Spectacled eider, Somateria fischeri  
King eider, Somateria spectabilis 
Common eider, Somateria mollissima 
Harlequin duck, Histrionicus histrionicus 
Labrador duck, Camptorhynchus labradorius (E) 
Surf scoter, Melanitta perspicillata 
Velvet scoter, Melanitta fusca (A) 
White-winged scoter, Melanitta deglandi 
Stejneger's scoter, Melanitta stejnegeri 
Common scoter, Melanitta nigra (A) 
Black scoter, Melanitta americana 
Long-tailed duck, Clangula hyemalis 
Bufflehead, Bucephala albeola 
Common goldeneye, Bucephala clangula 
Barrow's goldeneye, Bucephala islandica 
Smew, Mergellus albellus (A) 
Hooded merganser, Lophodytes cucullatus 
Common merganser, Mergus merganser 
Red-breasted merganser, Mergus serrator 
Masked duck, Nomonyx dominicus 
Ruddy duck, Oxyura jamaicensis

Guans, chachalacas, and curassows

Order: GalliformesFamily: Cracidae

The chachalacas, guans and curassows are birds in the family Cracidae. These are large birds, similar in general appearance to turkeys. The guans and curassows live in trees, but the smaller chachalacas are found in more open scrubby habitats. They are generally dull-plumaged, but the curassows and some guans have colorful facial ornaments.

Plain chachalaca, Ortalis vetula 
Gray-headed chachalaca, Ortalis cinereiceps 
Rufous-vented chachalaca, Ortalis ruficauda 
Rufous-bellied chachalaca, Ortalis wagleri 
West Mexican chachalaca, Ortalis poliocephala 
White-bellied chachalaca, Ortalis leucogastra 
Baudo guan, Penelope ortoni (A) 
Crested guan, Penelope purpurascens 
Black guan, Chamaepetes unicolor 
Highland guan, Penelopina nigra 
Horned guan, Oreophasis derbianus  
Great curassow, Crax rubra

Guineafowl

Order: GalliformesFamily: Numididae

Guineafowl are a group of African, seed-eating, ground-nesting birds that resemble partridges, but with featherless heads and spangled grey plumage.

Helmeted guineafowl, Numida meleagris (I)

New World quail

Order: GalliformesFamily: Odontophoridae

The New World quails are small, plump terrestrial birds only distantly related to the quails of the Old World, but named for their similar appearance and habits.

Tawny-faced quail, Rhynchortyx cinctus 
Mountain quail, Oreortyx pictus 
Buffy-crowned wood-partridge, Dendrortyx leucophrys 
Long-tailed wood-partridge, Dendrortyx macroura 
Bearded wood-partridge, Dendrortyx barbatus 
Banded quail, Philortyx fasciatus 
Northern bobwhite, Colinus virginianus  (Masked bobwhite C. v. ridgwayi)
Black-throated bobwhite, Colinus nigrogularis 
Crested bobwhite, Colinus cristatus 
Scaled quail, Callipepla squamata 
Elegant quail, Callipepla douglasii 
California quail, Callipepla californica 
Gambel's quail, Callipepla gambelii 
Montezuma quail, Cyrtonyx montezumae  (Merriam's Montezuma quail C. m. merriami)
Ocellated quail, Cyrtonyx ocellatus 
Singing quail, Dactylortyx thoracicus 
Marbled wood-quail, Odontophorus gujanensis 
Black-eared wood-quail, Odontophorus melanotis 
Tacarcuna wood-quail, Odontophorus dialeucos 
Black-breasted wood-quail, Odontophorus leucolaemus 
Spotted wood-quail, Odontophorus guttatus

Pheasants, grouse, and allies

Order: GalliformesFamily: Phasianidae

Phasianidae consists of the pheasants and their allies. These are terrestrial species, variable in size but generally plump with broad relatively short wings. Many species are gamebirds or have been domesticated as a food source for humans.

Wild turkey, Meleagris gallopavo 
Ocellated turkey, Meleagris ocellata 
Ruffed grouse, Bonasa umbellus 
Spruce grouse, Canachites canadensis 
Willow ptarmigan, Lagopus lagopus 
Rock ptarmigan, Lagopus muta 
White-tailed ptarmigan, Lagopus leucura 
Greater sage-grouse, Centrocercus urophasianus 
Gunnison sage-grouse, Centrocercus minimus 
Dusky grouse, Dendragapus obscurus 
Sooty grouse, Dendragapus fuliginosus 
Sharp-tailed grouse, Tympanuchus phasianellus 
Greater prairie-chicken, Tympanuchus cupido  (Attwater's prairie-chicken T. c. attwateri)
Lesser prairie-chicken, Tympanuchus pallidicinctus 
Red junglefowl, Gallus gallus (I) 
Gray partridge, Perdix perdix (I) 
Ring-necked pheasant, Phasianus colchicus (I) 
Indian peafowl, Pavo cristatus (I) 
Himalayan snowcock, Tetraogallus himalayensis (I) 
Chukar, Alectoris chukar (I)

Flamingos

Order: PhoenicopteriformesFamily: Phoenicopteridae

Flamingos filter-feed on shellfish and algae. Their oddly-shaped beaks are specially adapted to separate mud and silt from the food they consume and, uniquely, are used upside-down.

American flamingo, Phoenicopterus ruber

Grebes

Order: PodicipediformesFamily: Podicipedidae

Grebes are small to medium-sized diving birds. They breed on fresh water, but often visit the sea when migrating and in winter. They have lobed toes and are excellent swimmers and divers; however, their feet are placed far back on their bodies, making them quite ungainly on land.

Least grebe, Tachybaptus dominicus 
Pied-billed grebe, Podilymbus podiceps 
Atitlan grebe, Podilymbus gigas (E)  
Horned grebe, Podiceps auritus 
Red-necked grebe, Podiceps grisegena 
Eared grebe, Podiceps nigricollis 
Western grebe, Aechmophorus occidentalis 
Clark's grebe, Aechmophorus clarkii

Pigeons and doves

Order: ColumbiformesFamily: Columbidae

Pigeons and doves are stout-bodied birds with short necks and short slender bills with a fleshy cere.

Rock pigeon, Columba livia (I) 
Common wood pigeon, Columba palumbus (A) 
Pale-vented pigeon, Patagioenas cayennensis 
Scaled pigeon, Patagioenas speciosa 
Scaly-naped pigeon, Patagioenas squamosa 
White-crowned pigeon, Patagioenas leucocephala 
Red-billed pigeon, Patagioenas flavirostris 
Plain pigeon, Patagioenas inornata 
Band-tailed pigeon, Patagioenas fasciata 
Ring-tailed pigeon, Patagioenas caribaea 
Plumbeous pigeon, Patagioenas plumbea 
Ruddy pigeon, Patagioenas subvinacea 
Short-billed pigeon, Patagioenas nigrirostris 
Dusky pigeon, Patagioenas goodsoni 
Oriental turtle-dove, Streptopelia orientalis (A) 
African collared-dove, Streptopelia roseogrisea (I) 
European turtle-dove, Streptopelia turtur (A) 
Eurasian collared-dove, Streptopelia decaocto (I) 
Spotted dove, Streptopelia chinensis (I) 
Passenger pigeon, Ectopistes migratorius (E) 
Inca dove, Columbina inca 
Common ground dove, Columbina passerina 
Plain-breasted ground dove, Columbina minuta 
Ruddy ground dove, Columbina talpacoti 
Blue ground dove, Claravis pretiosa 
Maroon-chested ground dove, Claravis mondetoura 
Blue-headed quail-dove, Starnoenas cyanocephala 
Crested quail-dove, Geotrygon versicolor 
Ruddy quail-dove, Geotrygon montana 
Violaceous quail-dove, Geotrygon violacea 
Gray-fronted quail-dove, Geotrygon caniceps 
White-fronted quail-dove, Geotrygon leucometopia 
Key West quail-dove, Geotrygon chrysia 
Bridled quail-dove, Geotrygon mystacea 
Olive-backed quail-dove, Leptotrygon veraguensis 
White-tipped dove, Leptotila verreauxi 
Caribbean dove, Leptotila jamaicensis 
Gray-chested dove, Leptotila cassinii 
Gray-headed dove, Leptotila plumbeiceps 
Grenada dove, Leptotila wellsi 
Tuxtla quail-dove, Zentrygon carrikeri 
Buff-fronted quail-dove, Zentrygon costaricensis 
Purplish-backed quail-dove, Zentrygon lawrencii 
White-faced quail-dove, Zentrygon albifacies 
Chiriqui quail-dove, Zentrygon chiriquensis 
Russet-crowned quail-dove, Zentrygon goldmani 
White-winged dove, Zenaida asiatica 
Zenaida dove, Zenaida aurita 
Eared dove, Zenaida auriculata 
Mourning dove, Zenaida macroura 
Socorro dove, Zenaida graysoni

Sandgrouse
Order: PterocliformesFamily: Pteroclidae

Sandgrouse have small, pigeon like heads and necks, but sturdy compact bodies. They have long pointed wings and sometimes tails and a fast direct flight. Flocks fly to watering holes at dawn and dusk. Their legs are feathered down to the toes.

Chestnut-bellied sandgrouse, Pterocles exustus (I)

Cuckoos

Order: CuculiformesFamily: Cuculidae

The family Cuculidae includes cuckoos, roadrunners and anis. These birds are of variable size with slender bodies, long tails and strong legs.

Greater ani, Crotophaga major 
Smooth-billed ani, Crotophaga ani 
Groove-billed ani, Crotophaga sulcirostris 
Striped cuckoo, Tapera naevia 
Pheasant cuckoo, Dromococcyx phasianellus 
Lesser ground-cuckoo, Morococcyx erythropygus 
Lesser roadrunner, Geococcyx velox  
Greater roadrunner, Geococcyx californianus 
Rufous-vented ground-cuckoo, Neomorphus geoffroyi 
Common cuckoo, Cuculus canorus (A) 
Oriental cuckoo, Cuculus optatus (A) 
Little cuckoo, Coccycua minuta 
Dwarf cuckoo, Coccycua pumila (A) 
Squirrel cuckoo, Piaya cayana 
Dark-billed cuckoo, Coccyzus melacoryphus 
Yellow-billed cuckoo, Coccyzus americanus 
Pearly-breasted cuckoo, Coccyzus euleri (A) 
Mangrove cuckoo, Coccyzus minor 
Cocos cuckoo, Coccyzus ferrugineus 
Black-billed cuckoo, Coccyzus erythropthalmus 
Gray-capped cuckoo, Coccyzus lansbergi 
Chestnut-bellied cuckoo, Coccyzus pluvialis 
Bay-breasted cuckoo, Coccyzus rufigularis 
Jamaican lizard-cuckoo, Coccyzus vetula 
Puerto Rican lizard-cuckoo, Coccyzus vieilloti 
Great lizard-cuckoo, Coccyzus merlini 
Hispaniolan lizard-cuckoo, Coccyzus longirostris

Nightjars and allies

Order: CaprimulgiformesFamily: Caprimulgidae

Nightjars are medium-sized nocturnal birds that usually nest on the ground. They have long wings, short legs and very short bills. Most have small feet, of little use for walking, and long pointed wings. Their soft plumage is cryptically coloured to resemble bark or leaves.

Short-tailed nighthawk, Lurocalis semitorquatus 
Lesser nighthawk, Chordeiles acutipennis 
Common nighthawk, Chordeiles minor 
Antillean nighthawk, Chordeiles gundlachii 
Common pauraque, Nyctidromus albicollis 
Common poorwill, Phalaenoptilus nuttallii 
Jamaican pauraque, Siphonorhis americana (E?) 
Least pauraque, Siphonorhis brewsteri 
Eared poorwill, Nyctiphrynus mcleodii 
Yucatan poorwill, Nyctiphrynus yucatanicus 
Ocellated poorwill, Nyctiphrynus ocellatus 
Chuck-will's-widow, Antrostomus carolinensis 
Rufous nightjar, Antrostomus rufus 
Cuban nightjar, Antrostomus cubanensis 
Hispaniolan nightjar, Antrostomus ekmani 
Tawny-collared nightjar, Antrostomus salvini 
Yucatan nightjar, Antrostomus badius 
Buff-collared nightjar, Antrostomus ridgwayi 
Eastern whip-poor-will, Antrostomus vociferus 
Dusky nightjar, Antrostomus saturatus 
Mexican whip-poor-will, Antrostomus arizonae 
Puerto Rican nightjar, Antrostomus noctitherus  
White-tailed nightjar, Hydropsalis cayennensis 
Spot-tailed nightjar, Hydropsalis maculicaudus 
Gray nightjar, Caprimulgus jotaka (A)

Oilbird
Order: SteatornithiformesFamily: Steatornithidae

The oilbird is a slim, long-winged bird related to the nightjars. It is nocturnal and a specialist feeder on the fruit of the oil palm.

Oilbird, Steatornis caripensis

Potoos
Order: NyctibiiformesFamily: Nyctibiidae

The potoos (sometimes called poor-me-ones) are large near passerine birds related to the nightjars and frogmouths. They are nocturnal insectivores which lack the bristles around the mouth found in the true nightjars.

Great potoo, Nyctibius grandis 
Common potoo, Nyctibius griseus 
Northern potoo, Nyctibius jamaicensis

Swifts

Order: ApodiformesFamily: Apodidae

The swifts are small birds which spend the majority of their lives flying. These birds have very short legs and never settle voluntarily on the ground, perching instead only on vertical surfaces. Many swifts have long swept-back wings which resemble a crescent or boomerang.

Black swift, Cypseloides niger 
White-fronted swift, Cypseloides storeri 
White-chinned swift, Cypseloides cryptus 
Spot-fronted swift, Cypseloides cherriei 
Chestnut-collared swift, Streptoprocne rutila 
White-collared swift, Streptoprocne zonaris 
White-naped swift, Streptoprocne semicollaris 
Chimney swift, Chaetura pelagica 
Vaux's swift, Chaetura vauxi 
Chapman's swift, Chaetura chapmani (A) 
Short-tailed swift, Chaetura brachyura 
Sick's swift, Chaetura meridionalis (A) }
Band-rumped swift, Chaetura spinicaudus 
Costa Rican swift, Chaetura fumosa 
Gray-rumped swift, Chaetura cinereiventris 
Lesser Antillean swift, Chaetura martinica 
White-throated needletail Hirundapus caudacutus (A) 
Common swift, Apus apus (A) 
Fork-tailed swift, Apus pacificus (A) 
Alpine swift, Apus melba (A) 
White-throated swift, Aeronautes saxatalis 
Lesser swallow-tailed swift, Panyptila cayennensis 
Great swallow-tailed swift, Panyptila sanctihieronymi 
Antillean palm-swift, Tachornis phoenicobia

Hummingbirds

Order: ApodiformesFamily: Trochilidae

Hummingbirds are small birds capable of hovering in mid-air due to the rapid flapping of their wings. They are the only birds that can fly backwards.

White-necked jacobin, Florisuga mellivora 
White-tipped sicklebill, Eutoxeres aquila 
Bronzy hermit, Glaucis aeneus 
Rufous-breasted hermit, Glaucis hirsutus 
Band-tailed barbthroat, Threnetes ruckeri 
Green hermit, Phaethornis guy 
Mexican hermit, Phaethornis mexicanus 
Long-billed hermit, Phaethornis longirostris 
Pale-bellied hermit, Phaethornis anthophilus 
Stripe-throated hermit, Phaethornis striigularis 
Green-fronted lancebill, Doryfera ludovicae 
Brown violetear, Colibri delphinae 
Mexican violetear, Colibri thalassinus 
Lesser violetear, Colibri cyanotus
Tooth-billed hummingbird, Androdon aequatorialis 
Purple-crowned fairy, Heliothryx barroti 
Ruby-topaz hummingbird, Chrysolampis mosquitus  
Green-breasted mango, Anthracothorax prevostii 
Black-throated mango, Anthracothorax nigricollis 
Veraguan mango, Anthracothorax veraguensis 
Hispaniolan mango, Anthracothorax dominicus 
Puerto Rican mango, Anthracothorax aurulentus 
Green mango, Anthracothorax viridis 
Jamaican mango, Anthracothorax mango 
Purple-throated carib, Eulampis jugularis 
Green-throated carib, Eulampis holosericeus 
Green thorntail, Discosura conversii 
Short-crested coquette, Lophornis brachylophus 
Rufous-crested coquette, Lophornis delattrei 
Black-crested coquette, Lophornis helenae 
White-crested coquette, Lophornis adorabilis 
Greenish puffleg, Haplophaedia aureliae 
Green-crowned brilliant, Heliodoxa jacula 
Rivoli's hummingbird, Eugenes fulgens 
Talamanca hummingbird, Eugenes spectabilis
Fiery-throated hummingbird, Panterpe insignis 
Long-billed starthroat, Heliomaster longirostris 
Plain-capped starthroat, Heliomaster constantii 
Green-throated mountain-gem, Lampornis viridipallens 
Green-breasted mountain-gem, Lampornis sybillae 
Amethyst-throated hummingbird, Lampornis amethystinus 
Blue-throated hummingbird, Lampornis clemenciae 
White-bellied mountain-gem, Lampornis hemileucus 
Purple-throated mountain-gem, Lampornis calolaemus 
White-throated mountain-gem, Lampornis castaneoventris 
Garnet-throated hummingbird, Lamprolaima rhami 
Magenta-throated woodstar, Philodice bryantae 
Purple-throated woodstar, Philodice mitchellii 
Slender sheartail, Doricha enicura 
Mexican sheartail, Doricha eliza 
Sparkling-tailed hummingbird, Tilmatura dupontii 
Lucifer hummingbird, Calothorax lucifer 
Beautiful hummingbird, Calothorax pulcher 
Ruby-throated hummingbird, Archilochus colubris 
Black-chinned hummingbird, Archilochus alexandri 
Vervain hummingbird, Mellisuga minima 
Bee hummingbird, Mellisuga helenae 
Bahama woodstar, Nesophlox evelynae 
Inagua woodstar, Nesophlox lyrura 
Anna's hummingbird, Calypte anna 
Costa's hummingbird, Calypte costae 
Calliope hummingbird, Selasphorus calliope 
Rufous hummingbird, Selasphorus rufus 
Allen's hummingbird, Selasphorus sasin 
Broad-tailed hummingbird, Selasphorus platycercus 
Bumblebee hummingbird, Selasphorus heloisa 
Wine-throated hummingbird, Selasphorus ellioti 
Volcano hummingbird, Selasphorus flammula 
Scintillant hummingbird, Selasphorus scintilla 
Glow-throated hummingbird, Selasphorus ardens 
Dusky hummingbird, Phaeoptila sordida 
Cuban emerald, Riccordia ricordii 
Brace's emerald, Riccordia bracei (E) 
Hispaniolan emerald, Riccordia swainsonii 
Puerto Rican emerald, Riccordia maugaeus 
Blue-headed hummingbird, Riccordia bicolor 
Broad-billed hummingbird, Cynanthus latirostris 
Tres Marias hummingbird, Cynanthus lawrencei  
Turquoise-crowned hummingbird, Cynanthus doubledayi 
Golden-crowned emerald, Cynanthus auriceps 
Cozumel emerald, Cynanthus forficatus 
Canivet's emerald, Cynanthus canivetii 
Garden emerald, Chlorostilbon assimilis 
White-eared hummingbird, Basilinna leucotis 
Xantus's hummingbird, Basilinna xantusii 
Wedge-tailed sabrewing, Pampa curvipennis 
Long-tailed sabrewing, Pampa excellens 
Rufous sabrewing, Pampa rufa 
Emerald-chinned hummingbird, Abeillia abeillei 
Violet-headed hummingbird, Klais guimeti 
Antillean crested hummingbird, Orthorhyncus cristatus 
Violet sabrewing, Campylopterus hemileucurus 
Bronze-tailed plumeleteer, Chalybura urochrysia 
White-vented plumeleteer, Chalybura buffonii 
Crowned woodnymph, Thalurania colombica 
Snowcap, Microchera albocoronata 
Coppery-headed emerald, Microchera cupreiceps 
White-tailed emerald, Microchera chionura 
Violet-capped hummingbird, Goldmania violiceps 
Pirre hummingbird, Goldmania bella 
Mexican woodnymph, Eupherusa ridgwayi 
White-tailed hummingbird, Eupherusa poliocerca 
Blue-capped hummingbird, Eupherusa cyanophrys 
Stripe-tailed hummingbird, Eupherusa eximia 
Black-bellied hummingbird, Eupherusa nigriventris 
Scaly-breasted hummingbird, Phaeochroa cuvierii 
Red-billed streamertail, Trochilus polytmus 
Black-billed streamertail, Trochilus scitulus 
Violet-crowned hummingbird, Ramosomyia violiceps 
Green-fronted hummingbird, Ramosomyia viridifrons 
Azure-crowned hummingbird, Saucerottia cyanocephala 
Blue-vented hummingbird, Saucerottia hoffmanni  
Berylline hummingbird, Saucerottia beryllina 
Blue-tailed hummingbird, Saucerottia cyanura 
Snowy-bellied hummingbird, Saucerottia edward 
Cinnamon hummingbird, Amazilia rutila 
Buff-bellied hummingbird, Amazilia yucatanensis 
Rufous-tailed hummingbird, Amazilia tzacatl 
Honduran emerald, Amazilia luciae 
Mangrove hummingbird, Amazilia boucardi 
Amazilia hummingbird, Amazilis amazilia (A) 
Sapphire-throated hummingbird, Chrysuronia coeruleogularis 
Humboldt's sapphire, Chrysuronia humboldtii 
Blue-chested hummingbird, Polyerata amabilis 
Charming hummingbird, Polyerata decora 
White-bellied emerald, Chlorestes candida 
Blue-throated goldentail, Chlorestes eliciae 
Violet-bellied hummingbird, Chlorestes julie

Rails, gallinules and coots

Order: GruiformesFamily: Rallidae

Rallidae is a large family of small to medium-sized birds which includes the rails, crakes, coots and gallinules. The most typical family members occupy dense vegetation in damp environments near lakes, swamps or rivers. In general they are shy and secretive birds, making them difficult to observe. Most species have strong legs and long toes which are well adapted to soft uneven surfaces. They tend to have short, rounded wings and to be weak fliers.

Colombian crake, Neocrex colombiana 
Paint-billed crake, Neocrex erythrops 
Zapata rail, Cyanolimnas cerverai 
Spotted rail, Pardirallus maculatus 
Uniform crake, Amaurolimnas concolor 
Rufous-necked wood-rail, Aramides axillaris 
Russet-naped wood-rail, Aramides albiventris 
Gray-cowled wood-rail, Aramides cajaneus 
Ridgway's rail, Rallus obsoletus  (Rallus o. obsoletus R. o. obsoletus, R. o. yumanensis and R. o. levipes)
Clapper rail, Rallus crepitans 
Aztec rail, Rallus tenuirostris 
Mangrove rail, Rallus longirostris 
King rail, Rallus elegans 
Virginia rail, Rallus limicola 
Western water-rail, Rallus aquaticus (A) 
Corn crake, Crex crex (A) 
Sora, Porzana carolina 
Spotted crake, Porzana porzana (A) 
Common gallinule, Gallinula galeata 
Common moorhen, Gallinula chloropus (A) 
Eurasian coot, Fulica atra (A) 
American coot, Fulica americana 
Purple gallinule, Porphyrio martinicus 
Azure gallinule, Porphyrio flavirostris (A) 
Purple swamphen, Porphyrio porphyrio  (I)
Ocellated crake, Micropygia schomburgkii (A) 
Yellow rail, Coturnicops noveboracensis 
Yellow-breasted crake, Hapalocrex flaviventer 
Ruddy crake, Laterallus ruber 
White-throated crake, Laterallus albigularis 
Gray-breasted crake, Laterallus exilis 
Black rail, Laterallus jamaicensis

Finfoots
Order: GruiformesFamily: Heliornithidae

Heliornithidae is a small family of tropical birds with webbed lobes on their feet similar to those of grebes and coots.

Sungrebe, Heliornis fulica

Limpkin

Order: GruiformesFamily: Aramidae

The limpkin is an odd bird that looks like a large rail, but is skeletally closer to the cranes. It is found in marshes with some trees or scrub in the Caribbean, South America and southern Florida.

Limpkin, Aramus guarauna

Cranes
Order: GruiformesFamily: Gruidae

Cranes are large, long-legged and long-necked birds. Unlike the similar-looking but unrelated herons, cranes fly with necks outstretched, not pulled back. Most have elaborate and noisy courting displays or "dances".

Sandhill crane, Antigone canadensis  (ssp. nesiotes and pulla)
Common crane, Grus grus (A) 
Whooping crane, Grus americana   (and )
Hooded crane, Grus monacha (A)

Thick-knees
Order: CharadriiformesFamily: Burhinidae

The thick-knees are a group of waders found worldwide within the tropical zone, with some species also breeding in temperate Europe and Australia. They are medium to large waders with strong black or yellow-black bills, large yellow eyes and cryptic plumage. Despite being classed as waders, most species have a preference for arid or semi-arid habitats.

Double-striped thick-knee, Burhinus bistriatus

Stilts and avocets

Order: CharadriiformesFamily: Recurvirostridae

Recurvirostridae is a family of large wading birds, which includes the avocets and stilts. The avocets have long legs and long up-curved bills. The stilts have extremely long legs and long, thin, straight bills.

Black-winged stilt, Himantopus himantopus (A) 
Black-necked stilt, Himantopus mexicanus  (Hawaiian stilt H. m. knudseni)
American avocet, Recurvirostra americana

Oystercatchers

Order: CharadriiformesFamily: Haematopodidae

The oystercatchers are large, obvious and noisy plover-like birds, with strong bills used for smashing or prising open molluscs.

Eurasian oystercatcher, Haematopus ostralegus (A) 
American oystercatcher, Haematopus palliatus 
Black oystercatcher, Haematopus bachmani

Lapwings and plovers

Order: CharadriiformesFamily: Charadriidae

The family Charadriidae includes the plovers, dotterels and lapwings. They are small to medium-sized birds with compact bodies, short, thick necks and long, usually pointed, wings. They are found in open country worldwide, mostly in habitats near water.

Northern lapwing, Vanellus vanellus (A) 
Southern lapwing, Vanellus chilensis (A) 
Black-bellied plover, Pluvialis squatarola 
European golden-plover, Pluvialis apricaria (C) 
American golden-plover, Pluvialis dominica 
Pacific golden-plover, Pluvialis fulva 
Eurasian dotterel, Charadrius morinellus (A) 
Killdeer, Charadrius vociferus 
Common ringed plover, Charadrius hiaticula 
Semipalmated plover, Charadrius semipalmatus 
Piping plover, Charadrius melodus   or 
Little ringed plover, Charadrius dubius (A) 
Lesser sand plover, Charadrius mongolus (A) 
Greater sand plover, Charadrius leschenaultii (A) 
Oriental plover, Charadrius veredus (A) 
Wilson's plover, Charadrius wilsonia 
Collared plover, Charadrius collaris 
Mountain plover, Charadrius montanus 
Snowy plover, Charadrius nivosus )

Jacanas
Order: CharadriiformesFamily: Jacanidae

The jacanas are a group of waders found worldwide within the tropical zone. They are identifiable by their huge feet and claws which enable them to walk on floating vegetation in the shallow lakes that are their preferred habitat.

Northern jacana, Jacana spinosa 
Wattled jacana, Jacana jacana

Sandpipers and allies

Order: CharadriiformesFamily: Scolopacidae

Scolopacidae is a large diverse family of small to medium-sized shorebirds including the sandpipers, curlews, godwits, shanks, tattlers, woodcocks, snipes, dowitchers and phalaropes. The majority of these species eat small invertebrates picked out of the mud or soil. Different lengths of legs and bills enable multiple species to feed in the same habitat, particularly on the coast, without direct competition for food.

Upland sandpiper, Bartramia longicauda 
Bristle-thighed curlew, Numenius tahitiensis 
Whimbrel, Numenius phaeopus 
Little curlew, Numenius minutus (A) 
Eskimo curlew, Numenius borealis (E?)  
Long-billed curlew, Numenius americanus 
Far Eastern curlew, Numenius madagascariensis (A) 
Slender-billed curlew, Numenius tenuirostris (E?)  
Eurasian curlew, Numenius arquata (A) 
Bar-tailed godwit, Limosa lapponica 
Black-tailed godwit, Limosa limosa (A) 
Hudsonian godwit, Limosa haemastica 
Marbled godwit, Limosa fedoa 
Ruddy turnstone, Arenaria interpres 
Black turnstone, Arenaria melanocephala 
Great knot, Calidris tenuirostris (A) 
Red knot, Calidris canutus 
Surfbird, Calidris virgata 
Ruff, Calidris pugnax 
Broad-billed sandpiper, Calidris falcinellus (A) 
Sharp-tailed sandpiper, Calidris acuminata (A) 
Stilt sandpiper, Calidris himantopus 
Curlew sandpiper, Calidris ferruginea 
Temminck's stint, Calidris temminckii (A) 
Long-toed stint, Calidris subminuta (A) 
Spoon-billed sandpiper, Calidris pygmea (A) 
Red-necked stint, Calidris ruficollis 
Sanderling, Calidris alba 
Dunlin, Calidris alpina 
Rock sandpiper, Calidris ptilocnemis 
Purple sandpiper, Calidris maritima 
Baird's sandpiper, Calidris bairdii 
Little stint, Calidris minuta (A) 
Least sandpiper, Calidris minutilla 
White-rumped sandpiper, Calidris fuscicollis 
Buff-breasted sandpiper, Calidris subruficollis 
Pectoral sandpiper, Calidris melanotos 
Semipalmated sandpiper, Calidris pusilla 
Western sandpiper, Calidris mauri 
Short-billed dowitcher, Limnodromus griseus 
Long-billed dowitcher, Limnodromus scolopaceus 
Jack snipe, Lymnocryptes minimus (A) 
Eurasian woodcock, Scolopax rusticola (A) 
American woodcock, Scolopax minor 
Solitary snipe, Gallinago solitaria (A) 
Pin-tailed snipe, Gallinago stenura (A) 
Common snipe, Gallinago gallinago 
Wilson's snipe, Gallinago delicata 
Terek sandpiper, Xenus cinereus (A) 
Common sandpiper, Actitis hypoleucos (A) 
Spotted sandpiper, Actitis macularius 
Green sandpiper, Tringa ochropus (A) 
Solitary sandpiper, Tringa solitaria 
Gray-tailed tattler, Tringa brevipes (A) 
Wandering tattler, Tringa incana 
Lesser yellowlegs, Tringa flavipes 
Willet, Tringa semipalmata 
Spotted redshank, Tringa erythropus (A) 
Common greenshank, Tringa nebularia (A) 
Greater yellowlegs, Tringa melanoleuca 
Common redshank, Tringa totanus (A) 
Wood sandpiper, Tringa glareola 
Marsh sandpiper, Tringa stagnatilis (A) 
Wilson's phalarope, Phalaropus tricolor 
Red-necked phalarope, Phalaropus lobatus 
Red phalarope, Phalaropus fulicarius

Pratincoles and coursers
Order: CharadriiformesFamily: Glareolidae

Pratincoles have short legs, very long pointed wings and long forked tails. Their most unusual feature for birds classed as waders is that they typically hunt their insect prey on the wing like swallows, although they can also feed on the ground. Their short bills are an adaptation to aerial feeding.

Collared pratincole, Glareola pratincola (A) 
Oriental pratincole, Glareola maldivarum (A)

Skuas and jaegers

Order: CharadriiformesFamily: Stercorariidae

Skuas are in general medium to large birds, typically with gray or brown plumage, often with white markings on the wings. They have longish bills with hooked tips and webbed feet with sharp claws. They look like large dark gulls, but have a fleshy cere above the upper mandible. They are strong, acrobatic fliers.

Great skua, Stercorarius skua 
South polar skua, Stercorarius maccormicki 
Pomarine jaeger, Stercorarius pomarinus 
Parasitic jaeger, Stercorarius parasiticus 
Long-tailed jaeger, Stercorarius longicaudus

Auks, murres and puffins
Order: CharadriiformesFamily: Alcidae

Alcids are superficially similar to penguins due to their black-and-white colors, their upright posture and some of their habits, however they are only distantly related to the penguins and are able to fly. Auks live on the open sea, only deliberately coming ashore to nest.

Dovekie, Alle alle 
Common murre, Uria aalge 
Thick-billed murre, Uria lomvia 
Razorbill, Alca torda 
Great auk, Pinguinus impennis (E) 
Black guillemot, Cepphus grylle 
Pigeon guillemot, Cepphus columba 
Long-billed murrelet, Brachyramphus perdix 
Marbled murrelet, Brachyramphus marmoratus  
Kittlitz's murrelet, Brachyramphus brevirostris 
Scripps's murrelet, Synthliboramphus scrippsi 
Guadalupe murrelet, Synthliboramphus hypoleucus 
Craveri's murrelet, Synthliboramphus craveri 
Ancient murrelet, Synthliboramphus antiquus 
Cassin's auklet, Ptychoramphus aleuticus 
Parakeet auklet, Aethia psittacula 
Least auklet, Aethia pusilla 
Whiskered auklet, Aethia pygmaea 
Crested auklet, Aethia cristatella 
Rhinoceros auklet, Cerorhinca monocerata 
Atlantic puffin, Fratercula arctica 
Horned puffin, Fratercula corniculata 
Tufted puffin, Fratercula cirrhata

Gulls, terns, and skimmers

Order: CharadriiformesFamily: Laridae

Laridae is a family of medium to large seabirds and includes gulls, terns, kittiwakes and skimmers. Gulls are typically gray or white, often with black markings on the head or wings. They have stout, longish bills and webbed feet. Terns are a group of generally medium to large seabirds typically with grey or white plumage, often with black markings on the head. Most terns hunt fish by diving but some pick insects off the surface of fresh water. Terns are generally long-lived birds, with several species known to live in excess of 30 years. Skimmers are a small family of tropical tern-like birds. They have an elongated lower mandible which they use to feed by flying low over the water surface and skimming the water for small fish.

Swallow-tailed gull, Creagrus furcatus (A) 
Black-legged kittiwake, Rissa tridactyla 
Red-legged kittiwake, Rissa brevirostris 
Ivory gull, Pagophila eburnea 
Sabine's gull, Xema sabini 
Bonaparte's gull, Chroicocephalus philadelphia 
Gray-hooded gull, Chroicocephalus cirrocephalus (A) 
Black-headed gull, Chroicocephalus ridibundus 
Little gull, Hydrocoloeus minutus 
Ross's gull, Rhodostethia rosea 
Gray gull, Leucophaeus modestus (A) 
Laughing gull, Leucophaeus atricilla 
Franklin's gull, Leucophaeus pipixcan 
Pallas's gull, Ichthyaetus ichthyaetus (A) 
Belcher's gull, Larus belcheri (A) 
Black-tailed gull, Larus crassirostris (A) 
Heermann's gull, Larus heermanni 
Common gull, Larus canus 
Short-billed gull, Larus brachyrhynchus
Ring-billed gull, Larus delawarensis 
Western gull, Larus occidentalis 
Yellow-footed gull, Larus livens 
California gull, Larus californicus 
Herring gull Larus argentatus  )
Yellow-legged gull, Larus cachinnans (A) 
Iceland gull, Larus glaucoides 
Lesser black-backed gull, Larus fuscus 
Slaty-backed gull, Larus schistisagus 
Glaucous-winged gull, Larus glaucescens 
Glaucous gull, Larus hyperboreus 
Great black-backed gull, Larus marinus 
Kelp gull, Larus dominicanus 
Brown noddy, Anous stolidus 
Black noddy, Anous minutus 
White tern, Gygis alba 
Sooty tern, Onychoprion fuscatus 
Bridled tern, Onychoprion anaethetus 
Aleutian tern, Onychoprion aleuticus 
Least tern, Sternula antillarum   (California least tern S. a. browni)
Yellow-billed tern, Sternula superciliaris 
Large-billed tern, Phaetusa simplex (A) 
Gull-billed tern, Gelochelidon nilotica 
Caspian tern, Hydroprogne caspia 
Inca tern, Larosterna inca (A) 
Black tern, Chlidonias niger 
White-winged tern, Chlidonias leucopterus (A) 
Whiskered tern, Chlidonias hybridus (A) 
Roseate tern, Sterna dougallii  (ssp. dougallii:  or 
Common tern, Sterna hirundo 
Arctic tern, Sterna paradisaea 
Forster's tern, Sterna forsteri 
Royal tern, Thalasseus maximus 
Sandwich tern, Thalasseus sandvicensis 
Elegant tern, Thalasseus elegans 
Black skimmer, Rynchops niger 

Sunbittern
Order: EurypygiformesFamily: Eurypygidae

The sunbittern is a bittern-like bird of tropical regions of the Americas and the sole member of the family Eurypygidae (sometimes spelled Eurypigidae) and genus Eurypyga.

Sunbittern, Eurypyga helias 

Tropicbirds

Order: PhaethontiformesFamily: Phaethontidae

Tropicbirds are slender white birds of tropical oceans which have exceptionally long central tail feathers. Their heads and long wings have black markings.

 White-tailed tropicbird, Phaethon lepturus 
 Red-billed tropicbird, Phaethon aethereus 
 Red-tailed tropicbird, Phaethon rubricauda 

Penguins
Order: SphenisciformesFamily: Spheniscidae

The penguins are a group of aquatic, flightless birds living almost exclusively in the Southern Hemisphere. Most penguins feed on krill, fish, squid, and other forms of sealife caught while swimming underwater.

Galapagos penguin, Spheniscus mendiculus (A) 
Magellanic penguin, Spheniscus magellanicus (A) 

Loons

Order: GaviiformesFamily: Gaviidae

Loons are aquatic birds the size of a large duck, to which they are unrelated. Their plumage is largely gray or black, and they have spear-shaped bills. Loons swim well and fly adequately, but, because their legs are placed towards the rear of the body, are almost helpless on land.

Red-throated loon, Gavia stellata 
Arctic loon, Gavia arctica 
Pacific loon, Gavia pacifica 
Common loon, Gavia immer 
Yellow-billed loon, Gavia adamsii 

Albatrosses

Order: ProcellariiformesFamily: Diomedeidae

The albatrosses are amongst the largest of flying birds, and the great albatrosses from the genus Diomedea have the largest wingspans of any extant birds.

Yellow-nosed albatross, Thalassarche chlororhynchos (C) 
White-capped albatross, Thalassarche cauta 
Chatham albatross, Thalassarche eremita (A) 
Salvin's albatross, Thalassarche salvini (A) 
Black-browed albatross, Thalassarche melanophris (A) 
Light-mantled albatross, Phoebetria palpebrata (A) 
Wandering albatross, Diomedea exulans (A) 
Laysan albatross, Phoebastria immutabilis 
Black-footed albatross, Phoebastria nigripes 
Waved albatross, Phoebastria irrorata (A) 
Short-tailed albatross, Phoebastria albatrus  

Southern storm-petrels

Order: ProcellariiformesFamily: Oceanitidae

The southern storm-petrels are the smallest seabirds, relatives of the petrels, feeding on planktonic crustaceans and small fish picked from the surface, typically while hovering. The flight is fluttering and sometimes bat-like. Until 2018, this family's three species were included with the other storm-petrels in family Hydrobatidae.

Wilson's storm-petrel, Oceanites oceanicus 
White-faced storm-petrel, Pelagodroma marina 
Black-bellied storm-petrel, Fregetta tropica (A) 

Northern storm-petrels
Order: ProcellariiformesFamily: Hydrobatidae

Though the members of this family are similar in many respects to the southern storm-petrels, including their general appearance and habits, there are enough genetic differences to warrant their placement in a separate family.

European storm-petrel, Hydrobates pelagicus (A) 
Fork-tailed storm-petrel, Hydrobates furcatus 
Ringed storm-petrel, Hydrobates hornbyi (A) 
Swinhoe's storm-petrel, Hydrobates monorhis (A) 
Leach's storm-petrel, Hydrobates leucorhous 
Townsend's storm-petrel, Hydrobates socorroensis 
Ainley's storm-petrel, Hydrobates cheimomnestes 
Ashy storm-petrel, Hydrobates homochroa 
Band-rumped storm-petrel, Hydrobates castro 
Wedge-rumped storm-petrel, Hydrobates tethys (C) 
Black storm-petrel, Hydrobates melania 
Guadalupe storm-petrel, Hydrobates macrodactylus (E) 
Markham's storm-petrel, Hydrobates markhami (A) 
Tristram's storm-petrel, Hydrobates tristrami (A) 
Least storm-petrel, Hydrobates microsoma 

Shearwaters and petrels

Order: ProcellariiformesFamily: Procellariidae

The procellariids are the main group of medium-sized "true petrels", characterized by united nostrils with medium septum and a long outer functional primary.

Northern fulmar, Fulmarus glacialis 
Northern giant-petrel, Macronectes halli (A) 
Gray-faced petrel, Pterodroma gouldi (A) 
Providence petrel, Pterodroma solandri (A) 
Kermadec petrel, Pterodroma neglecta (A) 
Trindade petrel, Pterodroma arminjoniana 
Herald petrel, Pterodroma heraldica (A) 
Murphy's petrel, Pterodroma ultima 
Mottled petrel, Pterodroma inexpectata 
Bermuda petrel, Pterodroma cahow  
Jamaican petrel, Pterodoma caribbea (E?)  
Black-capped petrel, Pterodroma hasitata 
Juan Fernandez petrel, Pterodroma externa (A) 
Galapagos petrel, Pterodroma phaeopygia (A) 
Hawaiian petrel Pterodroma sandwichensis (C) 
Fea's petrel Pterodroma feae 
Zino's petrel, Pterodroma madeira (A) 
Cook's petrel, Pterodroma cookii 
Stejneger's petrel, Pterodroma longirostris (C) 
Tahiti petrel,  Pseudobulweria rostrata (A) 
Bulwer's petrel, Bulweria bulwerii (A) 
White-chinned petrel, Procellaria aequinoctialis (A) 
Parkinson's petrel, Procellaria parkinsoni 
Streaked shearwater, Calonectris leucomelas (C) 
Cory's shearwater, Calonectris diomedea 
Cape Verde shearwater, Calonectris edwardsii (A) 
Wedge-tailed shearwater, Ardenna pacifica (C) }
Buller's shearwater, Ardenna bulleri 
Short-tailed shearwater, Ardenna tenuirostris 
Sooty shearwater, Ardenna grisea 
Great shearwater, Ardenna gravis 
Pink-footed shearwater, Ardenna creatopus 
Flesh-footed shearwater, Ardenna carneipes 
Christmas shearwater, Puffinus nativitatis (A) 
Galapagos shearwater, Puffinus subalaris (A) 
Manx shearwater, Puffinus puffinus 
Townsend's shearwater, Puffinus auricularis (A)  
Newell's shearwater Puffinus newelli 
Black-vented shearwater, Puffinus opisthomelas 
Audubon's shearwater, Puffinus lherminieri 
Barolo shearwater, Puffinus baroli (A) 

Storks

Order: CiconiiformesFamily: Ciconiidae

Storks are large, heavy, long-legged, long-necked wading birds with long stout bills and wide wingspans. They lack the powder down that other wading birds such as herons, spoonbills and ibises use to clean off fish slime. Storks lack a pharynx and are mute.

White stork, Ciconia cionia (A) 
Maguari stork, Ciconia maguari (A)  
Jabiru, Jabiru mycteria 
Wood stork, Mycteria americana  

Frigatebirds
Order: SuliformesFamily: Fregatidae

Frigatebirds are large seabirds usually found over tropical oceans. They are large, black or black and white, with long wings and deeply forked tails. The males have colored inflatable throat pouches. They do not swim or walk and cannot take off from a flat surface. Having the largest wingspan-to-body-weight ratio of any bird, they are essentially aerial, able to stay aloft for more than a week.

Lesser frigatebird, Fregata ariel (A) 
Magnificent frigatebird, Fregata magnificens 
Great frigatebird, Fregata minor 

Boobies and gannets

Order: SuliformesFamily: Sulidae

The sulids comprise the gannets and boobies. Both groups are medium-large coastal seabirds that plunge-dive for fish.

Masked booby, Sula dactylatra 
Nazca booby, Sula granti 
Blue-footed booby, Sula nebouxii 
Peruvian booby, Sula variegata (A) 
Brown booby, Sula leucogaster 
Red-footed booby, Sula sula 
Northern gannet, Morus bassanus 

Darters
Order: SuliformesFamily: Anhingidae

Darters or anhingas are cormorant-like water birds with very long necks and long, straight beaks. They are fish eaters which often swim with only their neck above the water.

Anhinga, Anhinga anhinga 

Cormorants and shags

Order: SuliformesFamily: Phalacrocoracidae

Cormorants are medium-to-large aquatic birds, usually with mainly dark plumage and areas of colored skin on the face. The bill is long, thin and sharply hooked. Their feet are four-toed and webbed.

Brandt's cormorant, Urile penicillatus 
Red-faced cormorant, Urile urile 
Pelagic cormorant, Urile pelagicus 
Great cormorant, Phalacrocorax carbo 
Double-crested cormorant, Nannopterum auritum 
Neotropic cormorant, Nannopterum brasilianum 
Guanay cormorant, Leucocarbo bougainvilliorum  (A) 

Pelicans

Order: PelecaniformesFamily: Pelecanidae

Pelicans are very large water birds with a distinctive pouch under their beak. Like other birds in the order Pelecaniformes, they have four webbed toes.

American white pelican, Pelecanus erythrorhynchos 
Brown pelican, Pelecanus occidentalis 
Great white pelican, Pelecanus onocrotalus (A) 
Peruvian pelican, Pelecanus thagus (A) 

Herons, egrets, and bitterns

Order: PelecaniformesFamily: Ardeidae

The family Ardeidae contains the herons, egrets and bitterns. Herons and egrets are medium to large wading birds with long necks and legs. Bitterns tend to be shorter necked and more secretive. Members of Ardeidae fly with their necks retracted, unlike other long-necked birds such as storks, ibises and spoonbills.

Pinnated bittern, Botaurus pinnatus 
American bittern, Botaurus lentiginosus 
Yellow bittern, Ixobrychus sinensis (A) 
Least bittern, Ixobrychus exilis 
Little bittern, Ixobrychus minutus (A) 
Rufescent tiger-heron, Tigrisoma lineatum 
Fasciated tiger-heron, Tigrisoma fasciatum 
Bare-throated tiger-heron, Tigrisoma mexicanum 
Great blue heron, Ardea herodias 
Gray heron, Ardea cinerea (A) 
Cocoi heron, Ardea cocoi 
Purple heron, Ardea purpurea (A) 
Great egret, Ardea alba 
Intermediate egret, Ardea intermedia (A) 
Whistling heron, Syrigma sibilatrix (A) 
Chinese egret, Egretta eulophotes (A)  
Little egret, Egretta garzetta (C) 
Western reef-heron, Egretta gularis (A) 
Snowy egret, Egretta thula 
Little blue heron, Egretta caerulea 
Tricolored heron, Egretta tricolor 
Reddish egret, Egretta rufescens 
Cattle egret, Bubulcus ibis 
Chinese pond-heron, Ardeola bacchus (A) 
Squacco heron, Ardeola ralloides (A) 
Green heron, Butorides virescens 
Striated heron, Butorides striata 
Agami heron, Agamia agami 
Capped heron, Pilherodius pileatus 
Black-crowned night-heron, Nycticorax nycticorax 
Yellow-crowned night-heron, Nyctanassa violacea 
Boat-billed heron, Cochlearius cochlearius 

Ibises and spoonbills

Order: PelecaniformesFamily: Threskiornithidae

Members of this family have long, broad wings, are strong fliers and, rather surprisingly, given their size and weight, very capable soarers. The body tends to be elongated, the neck more so, with rather long legs. The bill is also long, decurved in the case of the ibises, straight and distinctively flattened in the spoonbills.

White ibis, Eudocimus albus 
Scarlet ibis, Eudocimus ruber 
Glossy ibis, Plegadis falcinellus 
White-faced ibis, Plegadis chihi 
Green ibis, Mesembrinibis cayennensis 
Bare-faced ibis, Phimosus infuscatus (A) 
Buff-necked ibis, Theristicus caudatus (A) 
African sacred ibis, Threskiornis aethiopicus (I) 
Eurasian spoonbill, Platalea leucorodia (A) 
Roseate spoonbill, Platalea ajaja 

New World vultures

Order: CathartiformesFamily: Cathartidae

The New World vultures are not closely related to Old World vultures, but superficially resemble them because of convergent evolution. Like the Old World vultures, they are scavengers. However, unlike Old World vultures, which find carcasses by sight, New World vultures have a good sense of smell with which they locate carcasses.

California condor, Gymnogyps californianus   (and )
King vulture, Sarcoramphus papa 
Black vulture, Coragyps atratus 
Turkey vulture, Cathartes aura 
Lesser yellow-headed vulture, Cathartes burrovianus 

Osprey

Order: AccipitriformesFamily: Pandionidae

Pandionidae is a family of fish-eating birds of prey, possessing a very large, powerful hooked beak for tearing flesh from their prey, strong legs, powerful talons and keen eyesight. The family is monotypic.

Osprey, Pandion haliaetus 

Hawks, eagles, and kites

Order: AccipitriformesFamily: Accipitridae

Accipitridae is a family of birds of prey, which includes hawks, eagles, kites, harriers and Old World vultures. These birds have very large powerful hooked beaks for tearing flesh from their prey, strong legs, powerful talons and keen eyesight.

Pearl kite, Gampsonyx swainsonii 
White-tailed kite, Elanus leucurus 
Hook-billed kite, Chondrohierax uncinatus  
Cuban kite, Chondrohierax wilsonii 
Gray-headed kite, Leptodon cayanensis 
Swallow-tailed kite, Elanoides forficatus 
Crested eagle, Morphnus guianensis 
Harpy eagle, Harpia harpyja  
Golden eagle, Aquila chrysaetos 
Black hawk-eagle, Spizaetus tyrannus 
Black-and-white hawk-eagle, Spizaetus melanoleucus 
Ornate hawk-eagle, Spizaetus ornatus 
Double-toothed kite, Harpagus bidentatus 
Northern harrier, Circus hudsonius 
Long-winged harrier, Circus buffoni 
Western marsh harrier, Circus aeruginosus (A) 
Gray-bellied hawk, Accipiter poliogaster (A) 
Tiny hawk, Accipiter superciliosus 
Chinese sparrowhawk, Accipiter soloensis (A) 
Sharp-shinned hawk, Accipiter striatus  (Accipiter striatus venator A. s. venator: 
Cooper's hawk, Accipiter cooperii 
Gundlach's hawk, Accipiter gundlachi 
Bicolored hawk, Accipiter bicolor 
Northern goshawk, Accipiter gentilis 
Eurasian sparrowhawk, Accipiter nisus (A) 
Bald eagle, Haliaeetus leucocephalus 
White-tailed eagle, Haliaeetus albicilla (C) 
Steller's sea-eagle, Haliaeetus pelagicus (C) 
Booted eagle, Hieraaetus pennatus (A) 
Mississippi kite, Ictinia mississippiensis 
Plumbeous kite, Ictinia plumbea 
Black-collared hawk, Busarellus nigricollis 
Crane hawk, Geranospiza caerulescens 
Snail kite, Rostrhamus sociabilis 
Slender-billed kite, Helicolestes hamatus 
Black kite, Milvus migrans (A) 
Plumbeous hawk, Cryptoleucopteryx plumbea  
Common black hawk, Buteogallus anthracinus 
Cuban black hawk, Buteogallus gundlachii 
Savanna hawk, Buteogallus meridionalis 
Great black hawk, Buteogallus urubitinga 
Solitary eagle, Buteogallus solitarius 
Barred hawk, Morphnarchus princeps 
Roadside hawk, Rupornis magnirostris 
Harris's hawk, Parabuteo unicinctus 
White-tailed hawk, Geranoaetus albicaudatus 
White hawk, Pseudastur albicollis 
Semiplumbeous hawk, Leucopternis semiplumbeus 
Gray hawk, Buteo plagiatus
Gray-lined hawk, Buteo nitidus 
Red-shouldered hawk, Buteo lineatus 
Ridgway's hawk, Buteo ridgwayi 
Broad-winged hawk, Buteo platypterus 
Short-tailed hawk, Buteo brachyurus 
Swainson's hawk, Buteo swainsoni 
Zone-tailed hawk, Buteo albonotatus 
Red-tailed hawk, Buteo jamaicensis 
Rough-legged hawk, Buteo lagopus 
Ferruginous hawk, Buteo regalis 
Long-legged buzzard, Buteo rufinus (A) 

Barn-owls

Order: StrigiformesFamily: Tytonidae

Barn-owls are medium to large owls with large heads and characteristic heart-shaped faces. They have long strong legs with powerful talons.

Barn owl, Tyto alba 
Ashy-faced owl, Tyto glaucops 

Owls

Order: StrigiformesFamily: Strigidae

Typical owls are small to large solitary nocturnal birds of prey. They have large forward-facing eyes and ears, a hawk-like beak and a conspicuous circle of feathers around each eye called a facial disk.

Oriental scops-owl, Otus sunia (A) 
Flammulated owl, Psiloscops flammeolus 
Puerto Rican owl, Gymnasio nudipes 
Whiskered screech-owl, Megascops trichopsis 
Bare-shanked screech-owl, Megascops clarkii 
Tropical screech-owl, Megascops choliba 
Bearded screech-owl, Megascops barbarus 
Pacific screech-owl, Megascops cooperi 
Western screech-owl, Megascops kennicottii 
Eastern screech-owl, Megascops asio 
Balsas screech-owl, Megascops seductus 
Middle American screech-owl, Megascops guatemalae 
Choco screech-owl, Megascops centralis 
Bare-legged owl, Margarobyas lawrencii 
Crested owl, Lophostrix cristata 
Spectacled owl, Pulsatrix perspicillata 
Great horned owl, Bubo virginianus 
Snowy owl, Bubo scandiacus 
Northern hawk owl, Surnia ulula 
Northern pygmy-owl, Glaucidium gnoma 
Costa Rican pygmy-owl, Glaucidium costaricanum 
Central American pygmy-owl, Glaucidium griseiceps 
Tamaulipas pygmy-owl, Glaucidium sanchezi 
Colima pygmy-owl, Glaucidium palmarum 
Ferruginous pygmy-owl, Glaucidium brasilianum 
Cuban pygmy-owl, Glaucidium siju 
Elf owl, Micrathene whitneyi 
Burrowing owl, Athene cunicularia 
Mottled owl, Strix virgata 
Black-and-white owl, Strix nigrolineata 
Spotted owl, Strix occidentalis  (Mexican spotted owl S. o. lucida and northern spotted owl S. o. caurina)
Barred owl, Strix varia 
Cinereous owl, Strix sartoriiFulvous owl, Strix fulvescens 
Great gray owl, Strix nebulosa 
Long-eared owl, Asio otus 
Stygian owl, Asio stygius 
Short-eared owl, Asio flammeus 
Striped owl, Asio clamator 
Jamaican owl, Asio grammicus 
Boreal owl, Aegolius funereus 
Northern saw-whet owl, Aegolius acadicus 
Bermuda saw-whet owl, Aegolius gradyi (E) 
Unspotted saw-whet owl, Aegolius ridgwayi 
Northern boobook, Ninox japonica (A)

Trogons

Order: TrogoniformesFamily: Trogonidae

Trogons are residents of tropical forests worldwide and have soft, often colorful, feathers with distinctive male and female plumage. They have compact bodies with long tails and short necks.

Cuban trogon, Priotelus temnurus 
Hispaniolan trogon, Priotelus roseigaster 
Lattice-tailed trogon, Trogon clathratus 
Slaty-tailed trogon, Trogon massena 
Black-tailed trogon, Trogon melanurus 
Black-headed trogon, Trogon melanocephalus 
Citreoline trogon, Trogon citreolus 
White-tailed trogon, Trogon chionurus 
Baird's trogon, Trogon bairdii 
Gartered trogon, Trogon caligatus 
Black-throated trogon, Trogon rufus 
Elegant trogon, Trogon elegans 
Mountain trogon, Trogon mexicanus 
Collared trogon, Trogon collaris 
Eared quetzal, Euptilotis neoxenus 
Golden-headed quetzal, Pharomachrus auriceps 
Resplendent quetzal, Pharomachrus mocinno  

Hoopoes
Order: UpupiformesFamily: Upupidae

This black, white and pink bird is quite unmistakable, especially in its erratic flight, which is like that of a giant butterfly. There are three members of its family. The song is a trisyllabic oop-oop-oop, which gives rise to its English and scientific names.

Eurasian hoopoe, Upupa epops (A) 

Todies

Order: CoraciiformesFamily: Todidae

Todies are a group of small near passerine forest species endemic to the Caribbean. These birds have colorful plumage and resemble small kingfishers, but have flattened bills with serrated edges. They eat small prey such as insects and lizards.

Cuban tody, Todus multicolor 
Broad-billed tody, Todus subulatus 
Narrow-billed tody, Todus angustirostris 
Jamaican tody, Todus todus 
Puerto Rican tody, Todus mexicanus 

Motmots

Order: CoraciiformesFamily: Motmotidae

The motmots have colorful plumage and long, graduated tails which they display by waggling back and forth. In most of the species, the barbs near the ends of the two longest (central) tail feathers are weak and fall off, leaving a length of bare shaft and creating a racket-shaped tail.

Tody motmot, Hylomanes momotula 
Blue-throated motmot, Aspatha gularis 
Russet-crowned motmot, Momotus mexicanus 
Blue-capped motmot, Momotus coeruliceps 
Lesson's motmot, Momotus lessonii 
Whooping motmot, Momotus subrufescens 
Rufous motmot, Baryphthengus martii 
Keel-billed motmot, Electron carinatum 
Broad-billed motmot, Electron platyrhynchum 
Turquoise-browed motmot, Eumomota superciliosa 

Kingfishers

Order: CoraciiformesFamily: Alcedinidae

Kingfishers are medium-sized birds with large heads, long pointed bills, short legs and stubby tails.

Ringed kingfisher, Megaceryle torquata 
Belted kingfisher, Megaceryle alcyon 
Amazon kingfisher, Chloroceryle amazona 
American pygmy kingfisher, Chloroceryle aenea 
Green kingfisher, Chloroceryle americana 
Green-and-rufous kingfisher, Chloroceryle inda 

Bee-eaters
Order: CoraciiformesFamily: Meropidae

The bee-eaters are a group of near passerine birds in the family Meropidae. They are characterized by richly colored plumage, slender bodies and usually elongated central tail feathers. All are colorful and have long downturned bills and pointed wings, which give them a swallow-like appearance when seen from afar.

European bee-eater, Merops apiaster (A) 

Puffbirds

Order: PiciformesFamily: Bucconidae

The puffbirds are related to the jacamars and have the same range, but lack the iridescent colors of that family. They are mainly brown, rufous, or gray, with large heads and flattened bills with hooked tips. The loose abundant plumage and short tails makes them look stout and puffy, giving rise to the English common name of the family.

Barred puffbird, Nystalus radiatus 
White-necked puffbird, Notharchus hyperrhynchus 
Black-breasted puffbird, Notharchus pectoralis 
Pied puffbird, Notharchus tectus 
White-whiskered puffbird, Malacoptila panamensis 
Lanceolated monklet, Micromonacha lanceolata 
Gray-cheeked nunlet, Nonnula frontalis 
Russet-throated puffbird, Hypnelus ruficollis 
White-fronted nunbird, Monasa morphoeus 

Jacamars

Order: PiciformesFamily: Galbulidae

The jacamars are near passerine birds from tropical South America, with a range that extends up to Mexico. They feed on insects caught on the wing, and are glossy, elegant birds with long bills and tails. In appearance and behavior they resemble the Old World bee-eaters, although they are more closely related to puffbirds.

Dusky-backed jacamar, Brachygalba salmoni 
Rufous-tailed jacamar, Galbula ruficauda 
Great jacamar, Jacamerops aureus 

New World barbets
Order: PiciformesFamily: Capitonidae

The barbets are plump birds, with short necks and large heads. They get their name from the bristles which fringe their heavy bills. Most species are brightly colored.

Spot-crowned barbet, Capito maculicoronatus 
Red-headed barbet, Eubucco bourcierii 

Toucan-barbets
Order: PiciformesFamily: Semnornithidae

The toucan-barbets are birds of montane forests in the Neotropics. They are highly social and non-migratory.

Prong-billed barbet, Semnornis frantzii 

Toucans

Order: PiciformesFamily: Ramphastidae

Toucans are near passerine birds from the Neotropics. They are brightly marked and have enormous, colorful bills which in some species amount to half their body length.

Northern emerald-toucanet, Aulacorhynchus prasinus 
Collared aracari, Pteroglossus torquatus 
Fiery-billed aracari, Pteroglossus frantzii 
Yellow-eared toucanet, Selenidera spectabilis 
Keel-billed toucan, Ramphastos sulfuratus 
Yellow-throated toucan, Ramphastos ambiguus 
Channel-billed toucan, Ramphastos vitellinus 

Woodpeckers

Order: PiciformesFamily: Picidae

Woodpeckers are small to medium-sized birds with chisel-like beaks, short legs, stiff tails and long tongues used for capturing insects. Some species have feet with two toes pointing forward and two backward, while several species have only three toes. Many woodpeckers have the habit of tapping noisily on tree trunks with their beaks.

Eurasian wryneck, Jynx torquilla (A) 
Olivaceous piculet, Picumnus olivaceus 
Antillean piculet, Nesoctites micromegas 
Lewis's woodpecker, Melanerpes lewis 
Guadeloupe woodpecker, Melanerpes herminieri 
Puerto Rican woodpecker, Melanerpes portoricensis 
Red-headed woodpecker, Melanerpes erythrocephalus 
Acorn woodpecker, Melanerpes formicivorus 
Golden-naped woodpecker, Melanerpes chrysauchen 
Black-cheeked woodpecker, Melanerpes pucherani 
Hispaniolan woodpecker, Melanerpes striatus 
Jamaican woodpecker, Melanerpes radiolatus 
Golden-cheeked woodpecker, Melanerpes chrysogenys 
Gray-breasted woodpecker, Melanerpes hypopolius 
Yucatan woodpecker, Melanerpes pygmaeus 
Red-crowned woodpecker, Melanerpes rubricapillus 
Gila woodpecker, Melanerpes uropygialis 
Hoffmann's woodpecker, Melanerpes hoffmannii 
Golden-fronted woodpecker, Melanerpes aurifrons 
Red-bellied woodpecker, Melanerpes carolinus 
West Indian woodpecker, Melanerpes superciliaris 
Williamson's sapsucker, Sphyrapicus thyroideus 
Yellow-bellied sapsucker, Sphyrapicus varius 
Red-naped sapsucker, Sphyrapicus nuchalis 
Red-breasted sapsucker, Sphyrapicus ruber 
Cuban green woodpecker, Xiphidiopicus percussus 
American three-toed woodpecker, Picoides dorsalis 
Black-backed woodpecker, Picoides arcticus 
Great spotted woodpecker, Dendrocopos major (A) 
Downy woodpecker, Dryobates pubescens 
Nuttall's woodpecker, Dryobates nuttallii 
Ladder-backed woodpecker, Dryobates scalaris 
Red-cockaded woodpecker, Dryobates borealis  
Hairy woodpecker, Dryobates villosus 
White-headed woodpecker, Dryobates albolarvatus 
Smoky-brown woodpecker, Dryobates fumigatus 
Arizona woodpecker, Dryobates arizonae 
Strickland's woodpecker, Dryobates stricklandi 
Red-rumped woodpecker, Dryobates kirkii 
Rufous-winged woodpecker, Piculus simplex 
Stripe-cheeked woodpecker, Piculus callopterus 
Golden-green woodpecker, Piculus chrysochloros 
Golden-olive woodpecker, Colaptes rubiginosus 
Gray-crowned woodpecker, Colaptes auricularis 
Spot-breasted woodpecker, Colaptes punctigula 
Northern flicker, Colaptes auratus 
Gilded flicker, Colaptes chrysoides 
Fernandina's flicker, Colaptes fernandinae 
Cinnamon woodpecker, Celeus loricatus 
Chestnut-colored woodpecker, Celeus castaneus 
Lineated woodpecker, Dryocopus lineatus 
Pileated woodpecker, Dryocopus pileatus 
Crimson-bellied woodpecker, Campephilus haematogaster 
Crimson-crested woodpecker, Campephilus melanoleucos 
Pale-billed woodpecker, Campephilus guatemalensis 
Ivory-billed woodpecker, Campephilus principalis (E?)  
Imperial woodpecker, Campephilus imperialis (E?)  

Falcons and caracaras

Order: FalconiformesFamily: Falconidae

Falconidae is a family of diurnal birds of prey, notably the falcons and caracaras. They differ from hawks, eagles and kites in that they kill with their beaks instead of their talons.

Laughing falcon, Herpetotheres cachinnans 
Barred forest-falcon, Micrastur ruficollis 
Slaty-backed forest-falcon, Micrastur mirandollei 
Collared forest-falcon, Micrastur semitorquatus 
Red-throated caracara, Ibycter americanus 
Crested caracara, Caracara plancus 
Guadalupe caracara, Caracara lutosa (E) 
Yellow-headed caracara, Milvago chimachima 
Eurasian kestrel, Falco tinnunculus (C) 
American kestrel, Falco sparverius 
Red-footed falcon, Falco vespertinus (A) 
Merlin, Falco columbarius 
Eurasian hobby, Falco subbuteo (A) 
Aplomado falcon, Falco femoralis  (ssp. septentrionalis:  and )
Bat falcon, Falco rufigularis 
Orange-breasted falcon, Falco deiroleucus 
Gyrfalcon, Falco rusticolus 
Peregrine falcon, Falco peregrinus 
Prairie falcon, Falco mexicanus 

African and New World parrots

Order: PsittaciformesFamily: Psittacidae

Parrots are small to large birds with a characteristic curved beak. Their upper mandibles have slight mobility in the joint with the skull and they have a generally erect stance. All parrots are zygodactyl, having the four toes on each foot placed two at the front and two to the back.

Painted parakeet, Pyrrhura picta 
Sulphur-winged parakeet, Pyrrhura hoffmanni 
Monk parakeet, Myiopsitta monachus (I) 
Carolina parakeet, Conuropsis carolinensis (E) 
Olive-throated parakeet, Eupsittula nana 
Orange-fronted parakeet, Eupsittula canicularis 
Brown-throated parakeet, Eupsittula pertinax 
Nanday parakeet, Aratinga nenday (I) 
Blue-and-yellow macaw, Ara ararauna 
Chestnut-fronted macaw, Ara severus 
Cuban macaw, Ara tricolor (E) 
Scarlet macaw, Ara macao 
Red-and-green macaw, Ara chloropterus 
Military macaw, Ara militaris 
Great green macaw, Ara ambiguus 
Red-bellied macaw, Orthopsittaca manilatus 
Green parakeet, Psittacara holochlorus 
Socorro parakeet, Psittacara brevipes 
Pacific parakeet, Psittacara strenuusCrimson-fronted parakeet, Psittacara finschi 
Cuban parakeet, Psittacara euops 
Puerto Rican parakeet, Psittacara maugei (E) 
Hispaniolan parakeet, Psittacara chloropterus 
Mitred parakeet, Psittacara mitratus (I) 
Thick-billed parrot, Rhynchopsitta pachyrhyncha  
Maroon-fronted parrot, Rhynchopsitta terrisi 
Barred parakeet, Bolborhynchus lineola 
Mexican parrotlet, Forpus cyanopygius 
Green-rumped parrotlet, Forpus passerinus 
Spectacled parrotlet, Forpus conspicillatus 
Orange-chinned parakeet, Brotogeris jugularis 
White-winged parakeet, Brotogeris versicolurus (I) 
Yellow-chevroned parakeet, Brotogeris chiriri (I) 
Lilac-tailed parrotlet, Touit batavicus 
Red-fronted parrotlet, Touit costaricensis 
Blue-fronted parrotlet, Touit dilectissimus 
Scarlet-shouldered parrotlet, Touit huetii 
Brown-hooded parrot, Pyrilia haematotis 
Saffron-headed parrot, Pyrilia pyrilia 
Blue-headed parrot, Pionus menstruus 
White-crowned parrot, Pionus senilis 
White-fronted parrot, Amazona albifrons 
Yellow-lored parrot, Amazona xantholora 
Cuban parrot, Amazona leucocephala  
Yellow-billed parrot, Amazona collaria 
Hispaniolan parrot, Amazona ventralis 
Puerto Rican parrot, Amazona vittata  
Black-billed parrot, Amazona agilis 
Red-crowned parrot, Amazona viridigenalis 
Lilac-crowned parrot, Amazona finschi 
Red-lored parrot, Amazona autumnalis 
Mealy parrot, Amazona farinosa 
Yellow-headed parrot, Amazona oratrix 
Yellow-naped parrot, Amazona auropalliata 
Yellow-crowned parrot, Amazona ochrocephala 
Red-necked parrot, Amazona arausiaca  
St. Lucia parrot, Amazona versicolor  
St. Vincent parrot, Amazona guildingii  
Orange-winged parrot, Amazona amazonica 
Imperial parrot, Amazona imperialis  

Old World parrots
Order: PsittaciformesFamily: Psittaculidae

Characteristic features of parrots include a strong curved bill, an upright stance, strong legs, and clawed zygodactyl feet. Many parrots are vividly colored, and some are multi-colored. Old World parrots are found from Africa east across south and southeast Asia and Oceania to Australia and New Zealand.

Rose-ringed parakeet, Psittacula krameri (I) 
Rosy-faced lovebird, Agapornis roseicollis (I) 

Sapayoa
Order: PasseriformesFamily: Sapayoidae

The sapayoa is the only member of its family, and is found in the lowland rainforests of Panama and north-western South America. It is usually seen in pairs or mixed-species flocks.

Sapayoa, Sapayoa aenigma 

Typical antbirds

Order: PasseriformesFamily: Thamnophilidae

The antbirds are a large family of small passerine birds of subtropical and tropical Central and South America. They are forest birds which tend to feed on insects at or near the ground. A sizable minority of them specialize in following columns of army ants to eat small invertebrates that leave their hiding places to flee from the ants. Many species lack bright color, with brown, black, and white being the dominant tones.

Fasciated antshrike, Cymbilaimus lineatus 
Great antshrike, Taraba major 
Barred antshrike, Thamnophilus doliatus 
Black antshrike, Thamnophilus nigriceps 
Black-hooded antshrike, Thamnophilus bridgesi 
Black-crowned antshrike, Thamnophilus atrinucha 
Spiny-faced antshrike, Xenornis setifrons 
Russet antshrike, Thamnistes anabatinus 
Plain antvireo, Dysithamnus mentalis 
Streak-crowned antvireo, Dysithamnus striaticeps 
Spot-crowned antvireo, Dysithamnus puncticeps 
Moustached antwren, Myrmotherula ignota 
Pacific antwren, Myrmotherula pacifica 
White-flanked antwren, Myrmotherula axillaris 
Slaty antwren, Myrmotherula schisticolor 
Checker-throated stipplethroat, Epinecrophylla fulviventris 
Rufous-winged antwren, Herpsilochmus rufimarginatus 
Dot-winged antwren, Microrhopias quixensis 
White-fringed antwren, Formicivora grisea 
Rufous-rumped antwren, Euchrepomis callinota 
Dusky antbird, Cercomacroides tyrannina 
Jet antbird, Cercomacra nigricans 
Bare-crowned antbird, Gymnocichla nudiceps 
Rusty-winged antwren, Herpsilochmus frater (A) 
White-bellied antbird, Myrmeciza longipes 
Zeledon's antbird, Hafferia zeledoni 
Chestnut-backed antbird, Poliocrania exsul 
Dull-mantled antbird, Sipia laemosticta 
Spotted antbird, Hylophylax naevioides 
Wing-banded antbird, Myrmornis torquata 
Bicolored antbird, Gymnopithys leucaspis 
Ocellated antbird, Phaenostictus mcleannani 

Gnateaters
Order: PasseriformesFamily: Conopophagidae

The members of this small family are found across northern South America and into Central America. They are forest birds, usually seen on the ground or in the low understory.

Black-crowned antpitta, Pittasoma michleri 

Antpittas
Order: PasseriformesFamily: Grallariidae

Antpittas resemble the true pittas with strong, longish legs, very short tails, and stout bills.

Scaled antpitta, Grallaria guatimalensis 
Streak-chested antpitta, Hylopezus perspicillatus 
Thicket antpitta, Hylopezus dives 
Ochre-breasted antpitta, Grallaricula flavirostris 

Tapaculos
Order: PasseriformesFamily: Rhinocryptidae

The tapaculos are small suboscine passeriform birds with numerous species in South and Central America. They are terrestrial species that fly only poorly on their short wings. They have strong legs, well-suited to their habitat of grassland or forest undergrowth. The tail is cocked and pointed towards the head.

Tacarcuna tapaculo, Scytalopus panamensis 
Choco tapaculo, Scytalopus chocoensis 
Silvery-fronted tapaculo, Scytalopus argentifrons 

Antthrushes
Order: PasseriformesFamily: Formicariidae

Antthrushes resemble small rails with strong, longish legs, very short tails, and stout bills.

Mayan antthrush, Formicarius moniliger 
Black-faced antthrush, Formicarius analis 
Black-headed antthrush, Formicarius nigricapillus 
Rufous-breasted antthrush, Formicarius rufipectus 

Ovenbirds and woodcreepers

Order: PasseriformesFamily: Furnariidae

Ovenbirds comprise a large family of small sub-oscine passerine bird species found in Central and South America. They are a diverse group of insectivores which gets its name from the elaborate "oven-like" clay nests built by some species, although others build stick nests or nest in tunnels or clefts in rock. The woodcreepers are brownish birds which maintain an upright vertical posture supported by their stiff tail vanes. They feed mainly on insects taken from tree trunks.

Tawny-throated leaftosser, Sclerurus mexicanus 
Gray-throated leaftosser, Sclerurus albigularis 
Scaly-throated leaftosser, Sclerurus guatemalensis 
Olivaceous woodcreeper, Sittasomus griseicapillus 
Long-tailed woodcreeper, Deconychura longicauda 
Ruddy woodcreeper, Dendrocincla homochroa 
Tawny-winged woodcreeper, Dendrocincla anabatina 
Plain-brown woodcreeper, Dendrocincla fuliginosa 
Wedge-billed woodcreeper, Glyphorynchus spirurus 
Northern barred-woodcreeper, Dendrocolaptes sanctithomae 
Black-banded woodcreeper, Dendrocolaptes picumnus 
Strong-billed woodcreeper, Xiphocolaptes promeropirhynchus 
Cocoa woodcreeper, Xiphorhynchus susurrans 
Ivory-billed woodcreeper, Xiphorhynchus flavigaster 
Black-striped woodcreeper, Xiphorhynchus lachrymosus 
Spotted woodcreeper, Xiphorhynchus erythropygius 
Straight-billed woodcreeper, Dendroplex picus 
Red-billed scythebill, Campylorhamphus trochilirostris 
Brown-billed scythebill, Campylorhamphus pusillus 
White-striped woodcreeper, Lepidocolaptes leucogaster 
Streak-headed woodcreeper, Lepidocolaptes souleyetii 
Spot-crowned woodcreeper, Lepidocolaptes affinis 
Plain xenops, Xenops minutus 
Streaked xenops, Xenops rutilans 
Buffy tuftedcheek, Pseudocolaptes lawrencii 
Sharp-tailed streamcreeper, Lochmias nematura 
Slaty-winged foliage-gleaner, Philydor fuscipenne 
Buff-fronted foliage-gleaner, Dendroma rufa 
Scaly-throated foliage-gleaner, Anabacerthia variegaticeps 
Lineated foliage-gleaner, Syndactyla subalaris 
Ruddy foliage-gleaner, Clibanornis rubiginosus 
Streak-breasted treehunter, Thripadectes rufobrunneus 
Buff-throated foliage-gleaner, Automolus ochrolaemus 
Chiriqui foliage-gleaner, Automolus exsertus 
Striped woodhaunter, Automolus subulatus 
Spotted barbtail, Premnoplex brunnescens 
Beautiful treerunner, Margarornis bellulus 
Ruddy treerunner, Margarornis rubiginosus 
Double-banded graytail, Xenerpestes minlosi 
Red-faced spinetail, Cranioleuca erythrops 
Coiba spinetail, Cranioleuca dissita 
Pale-breasted spinetail, Synallaxis albescens 
Slaty spinetail, Synallaxis brachyura 
Rufous-breasted spinetail, Synallaxis erythrothorax 

Manakins
Order: PasseriformesFamily: Pipridae

The manakins are a family of subtropical and tropical mainland Central and South America, and Trinidad and Tobago. They are compact forest birds, the males typically being brightly colored, although the females of most species are duller and usually green-plumaged. Manakins feed on small fruits, berries, and insects.

Lance-tailed manakin, Chiroxiphia lanceolata 
Long-tailed manakin, Chiroxiphia linearis 
White-ruffed manakin, Corapipo altera 
Green manakin, Cryptopipo holochlora 
Blue-crowned manakin, Lepidothrix coronata 
White-collared manakin, Manacus candei 
Orange-collared manakin, Manacus aurantiacus 
Golden-collared manakin, Manacus vitellinus 
White-crowned manakin, Pseudopipra pipra 
Red-capped manakin, Ceratopipra mentalis 
Golden-headed manakin, Ceratopipra erythrocephala 

Cotingas
Order: PasseriformesFamily: Cotingidae

The cotingas are birds of forests or forest edges in tropical Central and South America. Comparatively little is known about this diverse group, although all have broad bills with hooked tips, rounded wings, and strong legs. The males of many of the species are brightly colored or decorated with plumes or wattles.

Purple-throated fruitcrow, Querula purpurata 
Bare-necked umbrellabird, Cephalopterus glabricollis 
Lovely cotinga, Cotinga amabilis 
Turquoise cotinga, Cotinga ridgwayi 
Blue cotinga, Cotinga nattererii 
Rufous piha, Lipaugus unirufus 
Three-wattled bellbird, Procnias tricarunculatus 
Black-tipped cotinga, Carpodectes hopkei 
Yellow-billed cotinga, Carpodectes antoniae 
Snowy cotinga, Carpodectes nitidus 

Tityras and allies
Order: PasseriformesFamily: Tityridae

Tityridae are suboscine passerine birds found in forest and woodland in the Neotropics. The species in this family were formerly spread over the families Tyrannidae, Pipridae, and Cotingidae. They are small to medium-sized birds. They do not have the sophisticated vocal capabilities of the songbirds. Most, but not all, have plain coloring.

Northern schiffornis, Schiffornis veraepacis 
Russet-winged schiffornis, Schiffornis stenorhyncha 
Speckled mourner, Laniocera rufescens 
Masked tityra, Tityra semifasciata 
Black-crowned tityra, Tityra inquisitor 
Barred becard, Pachyramphus versicolor 
Cinereous becard, Pachyramphus rufus 
Cinnamon becard, Pachyramphus cinnamomeus 
White-winged becard, Pachyramphus polychopterus 
Black-and-white becard, Pachyramphus albogriseus 
Gray-collared becard, Pachyramphus major 
Rose-throated becard, Pachyramphus aglaiae 
One-colored becard, Pachyramphus homochrous 
Jamaican becard, Pachyramphus niger 

Sharpbill
Order: PasseriformesFamily: Oxyruncidae

The sharpbill is a small bird of dense forests in Central and South America. It feeds mostly on fruit but also eats insects.

Sharpbill, Oxyruncus cristatus 

Royal flycatcher and allies
Order: PasseriformesFamily: Onychorhynchidae

The members of this small family, created in 2018, were formerly considered to be tyrant flycatchers, family Tyrannidae.

 Royal flycatcher, Onychorhynchus coronatus 
 Ruddy-tailed flycatcher, Terenotriccus erythrurus 
 Tawny-breasted flycatcher, Myiobius villosus 
 Sulphur-rumped flycatcher, Myiobius sulphureipygius 
 Black-tailed flycatcher, Myiobius atricaudus 

Tyrant flycatchers

Order: PasseriformesFamily: Tyrannidae

Tyrant flycatchers are Passerine birds which occur throughout North and South America. They superficially resemble the Old World flycatchers, but are more robust and have stronger bills. They do not have the sophisticated vocal capabilities of the songbirds. Most, but not all, are rather plain. As the name implies, most are insectivorous.

Gray-headed piprites, Piprites griseiceps 
Stub-tailed spadebill, Platyrinchus cancrominus 
White-throated spadebill, Platyrinchus mystaceus 
Golden-crowned spadebill, Platyrinchus coronatus 
Olive-striped flycatcher, Mionectes olivaceus 
Ochre-bellied flycatcher, Mionectes oleagineus 
Sepia-capped flycatcher, Leptopogon amaurocephalus 
Slaty-capped flycatcher, Leptopogon superciliaris 
Yellow-green tyrannulet, Phylloscartes flavovirens 
Rufous-browed tyrannulet, Phylloscartes superciliaris 
Bronze-olive pygmy-tyrant, Pseudotriccus pelzelni 
Black-capped pygmy-tyrant, Myiornis atricapillus 
Scale-crested pygmy-tyrant, Lophotriccus pileatus 
Pale-eyed pygmy-tyrant, Lophotriccus pilaris 
Northern bentbill, Oncostoma cinereigulare 
Southern bentbill, Oncostoma olivaceum 
Slate-headed tody-flycatcher, Poecilotriccus sylvia 
Common tody-flycatcher, Todirostrum cinereum 
Black-headed tody-flycatcher, Todirostrum nigriceps 
Brownish twistwing, Cnipodectes subbrunneus 
Eye-ringed flatbill, Rhynchocyclus brevirostris 
Olivaceous flatbill, Rhynchocyclus olivaceus 
Yellow-olive flycatcher, Tolmomyias sulphurescens 
Yellow-margined flycatcher, Tolmomyias assimilis 
Yellow-breasted flycatcher, Tolmomyias flaviventris 
Yellow-bellied tyrannulet, Ornithion semiflavum 
Brown-capped tyrannulet, Ornithion brunneicapillus 
Northern beardless-tyrannulet, Camptostoma imberbe 
Southern beardless-tyrannulet, Camptostoma obsoletum 
Cocos flycatcher, Nesotriccus ridgwayi 
Mouse-colored tyrannulet, Nesotriccus murinus 
Yellow tyrannulet, Capsiempis flaveola 
Yellow-crowned tyrannulet, Tyrannulus elatus 
Forest elaenia, Myiopagis gaimardii 
Gray elaenia, Myiopagis caniceps 
Jamaican elaenia, Myiopagis cotta 
Greenish elaenia, Myiopagis viridicata 
Caribbean elaenia, Elaenia martinica 
Small-billed elaenia, Elaenia parvirostris 
Yellow-bellied elaenia, Elaenia flavogaster 
White-crested elaenia, Elaenia albiceps (A) 
Lesser elaenia, Elaenia chiriquensis 
Mountain elaenia, Elaenia frantzii 
Greater Antillean elaenia, Elaenia fallax 
Torrent tyrannulet, Serpophaga cinerea 
Rough-legged tyrannulet, Phyllomyias burmeisteri 
Sooty-headed tyrannulet, Phyllomyias griseiceps 
Guatemalan tyrannulet, Zimmerius vilissimus 
Mistletoe tyrannulet, Zimmerius parvus 
Bright-rumped attila, Attila spadiceus 
Choco sirystes, Sirystes albogriseus 
Rufous mourner, Rhytipterna holerythra 
Yucatan flycatcher, Myiarchus yucatanensis 
Sad flycatcher, Myiarchus barbirostris 
Dusky-capped flycatcher, Myiarchus tuberculifer 
Panama flycatcher, Myiarchus panamensis 
Ash-throated flycatcher, Myiarchus cinerascens 
Nutting's flycatcher, Myiarchus nuttingi 
Great crested flycatcher, Myiarchus crinitus 
Brown-crested flycatcher, Myiarchus tyrannulus 
Grenada flycatcher, Myiarchus nugator 
Rufous-tailed flycatcher, Myiarchus validus 
La Sagra's flycatcher, Myiarchus sagrae 
Stolid flycatcher, Myiarchus stolidus 
Puerto Rican flycatcher, Myiarchus antillarum 
Lesser Antillean flycatcher, Myiarchus oberi 
Flammulated flycatcher, Ramphotrigon flammulatum 
Lesser kiskadee, Philohydor lictor 
Great kiskadee, Pitangus sulphuratus 
Cattle tyrant, Machetornis rixosa 
Boat-billed flycatcher, Megarynchus pitangua 
Rusty-margined flycatcher, Myiozetetes cayanensis 
Social flycatcher, Myiozetetes similis 
Gray-capped flycatcher, Myiozetetes granadensis 
White-ringed flycatcher, Conopias albovittatus 
Golden-bellied flycatcher, Myiodynastes hemichrysus 
Golden-crowned flycatcher, Myiodynastes chrysocephalus 
Streaked flycatcher, Myiodynastes maculatus 
Sulphur-bellied flycatcher, Myiodynastes luteiventris 
Piratic flycatcher, Legatus leucophaius 
Variegated flycatcher, Empidonomus varius (A) 
Crowned slaty flycatcher, Empidonomus aurantioatrocristatus (A) 
Tropical kingbird, Tyrannus melancholicus 
Couch's kingbird, Tyrannus couchii 
Cassin's kingbird, Tyrannus vociferans 
Thick-billed kingbird, Tyrannus crassirostris 
Western kingbird, Tyrannus verticalis 
Eastern kingbird, Tyrannus tyrannus 
Gray kingbird, Tyrannus dominicensis 
Loggerhead kingbird, Tyrannus caudifasciatus 
Giant kingbird, Tyrannus cubensis 
Scissor-tailed flycatcher, Tyrannus forficatus 
Fork-tailed flycatcher, Tyrannus savana 
Bran-colored flycatcher, Myiophobus fasciatus 
Euler's flycatcher, Lathrotriccus euleri 
Tawny-chested flycatcher, Aphanotriccus capitalis 
Black-billed flycatcher, Aphanotriccus audax 
Belted flycatcher, Xenotriccus callizonus 
Pileated flycatcher, Xenotriccus mexicanus 
Tufted flycatcher, Mitrephanes phaeocercus 
Olive-sided flycatcher, Contopus cooperi 
Greater pewee, Contopus pertinax 
Dark pewee, Contopus lugubris 
Ochraceous pewee, Contopus ochraceus 
Western wood-pewee, Contopus sordidulus 
Eastern wood-pewee, Contopus virens 
Tropical pewee, Contopus cinereus 
Cuban pewee, Contopus caribaeus 
Jamaican pewee, Contopus pallidus 
Hispaniolan pewee, Contopus hispaniolensis 
Lesser Antillean pewee, Contopus latirostris 
Yellow-bellied flycatcher, Empidonax flaviventris 
Acadian flycatcher, Empidonax virescens 
Alder flycatcher, Empidonax alnorum 
Willow flycatcher, Empidonax traillii 
White-throated flycatcher, Empidonax albigularis 
Least flycatcher, Empidonax minimus 
Hammond's flycatcher, Empidonax hammondii 
Gray flycatcher, Empidonax wrightii 
Dusky flycatcher, Empidonax oberholseri 
Pine flycatcher, Empidonax affinis 
Pacific-slope flycatcher, Empidonax difficilis 
Cordilleran flycatcher, Empidonax occidentalis 
Yellowish flycatcher, Empidonax flavescens 
Buff-breasted flycatcher, Empidonax fulvifrons 
Black-capped flycatcher, Empidonax atriceps 
Black phoebe, Sayornis nigricans 
Eastern phoebe, Sayornis phoebe 
Say's phoebe, Sayornis saya 
Vermilion flycatcher, Pyrocephalus rubinus 
Pied water-tyrant, Fluvicola pica 
Northern scrub-flycatcher, Sublegatus arenarum 
Long-tailed tyrant, Colonia colonus 

Shrikes

Order: PasseriformesFamily: Laniidae

Shrikes are passerine birds known for their habit of catching other birds and small animals and impaling the uneaten portions of their bodies on thorns. A shrike's beak is hooked, like that of a typical bird of prey.

Brown shrike, Lanius cristatus (A) 
Red-backed shrike, Lanius collurio (A) 
Loggerhead shrike, Lanius ludovicianus 
Northern shrike, Lanius excubitor 

Vireos, shrike-babblers, and erpornis

Order: PasseriformesFamily: Vireonidae

The vireos are a group of small to medium-sized passerine birds. They are typically greenish in color and resemble wood warblers apart from their heavier bills.

Rufous-browed peppershrike, Cyclarhis gujanensis 
Scrub greenlet, Hylophilus flavipes 
Chestnut-sided shrike-vireo, Vireolanius melitophrys 
Green shrike-vireo, Vireolanius pulchellus 
Yellow-browed shrike-vireo, Vireolanius eximius 
Tawny-crowned greenlet, Tunchiornis ochraceiceps 
Lesser greenlet, Pachysylvia decurtata 
Golden-fronted greenlet, Pachysylvia aurantiifrons 
Golden vireo, Vireo hypochryseus 
Blue Mountain vireo, Vireo osburni 
Slaty vireo, Vireo brevipennis 
Black-capped vireo, Vireo atricapilla  
Dwarf vireo, Vireo nelsoni 
White-eyed vireo, Vireo griseus 
Thick-billed vireo, Vireo crassirostris 
Mangrove vireo, Vireo pallens 
Cozumel vireo, Vireo bairdi 
San Andres vireo, Vireo caribaeus 
Jamaican vireo, Vireo modestus 
Cuban vireo, Vireo gundlachii 
Puerto Rican vireo, Vireo latimeri 
Flat-billed vireo, Vireo nanus 
Bell's vireo, Vireo bellii  (Least Bell's vireo V. b. pusillus)
Gray vireo, Vireo vicinior 
Hutton's vireo, Vireo huttoni 
Yellow-throated vireo, Vireo flavifrons 
Yellow-winged vireo, Vireo carmioli 
Cassin's vireo, Vireo cassinii 
Blue-headed vireo, Vireo solitarius 
Plumbeous vireo, Vireo plumbeus 
Philadelphia vireo, Vireo philadelphicus 
Warbling vireo, Vireo gilvus 
Brown-capped vireo, Vireo leucophrys 
Red-eyed vireo, Vireo olivaceus 
Yellow-green vireo, Vireo flavoviridis 
Black-whiskered vireo, Vireo altiloquus 
Yucatan vireo, Vireo magister 

Crows, jays, and magpies

Order: PasseriformesFamily: Corvidae

The family Corvidae includes crows, ravens, jays, choughs, magpies, treepies, nutcrackers and ground jays. Corvids are above average in size among the Passeriformes, and some of the larger species show high levels of intelligence.

Canada jay, Perisoreus canadensis 
White-throated jay, Cyanolyca mirabilis 
Dwarf jay, Cyanolyca nana 
Black-throated jay, Cyanolyca pumilo 
Silvery-throated jay, Cyanolyca argentigula 
Azure-hooded jay, Cyanolyca cucullata 
Black-throated magpie-jay, Calocitta colliei 
White-throated magpie-jay, Calocitta formosa 
Brown jay, Psilorhinus morio 
Tufted jay, Cyanocorax dickeyi 
Black-chested jay, Cyanocorax affinis 
Green jay, Cyanocorax yncas 
Bushy-crested jay, Cyanocorax melanocyaneus 
San Blas jay, Cyanocorax sanblasianus 
Yucatan jay, Cyanocorax yucatanicus 
Purplish-backed jay, Cyanocorax beecheii 
Pinyon jay, Gymnorhinus cyanocephalus 
Steller's jay, Cyanocitta stelleri 
Blue jay, Cyanocitta cristata 
Florida scrub-jay, Aphelocoma coerulescens  
Island scrub-jay, Aphelocoma insularis 
California scrub-jay, Aphelocoma californica 
Woodhouse's scrub-jay, Aphelocoma woodhouseiiTransvolcanic jay, Aphelocoma ultramarina 
Mexican jay, Aphelocoma wollweberi 
Unicolored jay, Aphelocoma unicolor 
Clark's nutcracker, Nucifraga columbiana 
Black-billed magpie, Pica hudsonia 
Yellow-billed magpie, Pica nuttalli 
Eurasian jackdaw, Corvus monedula (A) 
Rook, Corvus frugilegus (A) 
American crow, Corvus brachyrhynchos 
Palm crow, Corvus palmarum 
Cuban crow, Corvus nasicus 
White-necked crow, Corvus leucognaphalus  
Hooded crow, Corvus cornix (A)
Jamaican crow, Corvus jamaicensis 
Tamaulipas crow, Corvus imparatus 
Sinaloa crow, Corvus sinaloae 
House crow, Corvus splendens (A) 
Fish crow, Corvus ossifragus 
Chihuahuan raven, Corvus cryptoleucus 
Common raven, Corvus corax 

Larks
Order: PasseriformesFamily: Alaudidae

Larks are small terrestrial birds with often extravagant songs and display flights. Most larks are fairly dull in appearance. Their food is insects and seeds.

Eurasian skylark, Alauda arvensis 
Horned lark, Eremophila alpestris  (E. a. strigata )

Swallows

Order: PasseriformesFamily: Hirundinidae

The family Hirundinidae is adapted to aerial feeding. They have a slender streamlined body, long pointed wings and a short bill with a wide gape. The feet are adapted to perching rather than walking, and the front toes are partially joined at the base.

Bank swallow, Riparia riparia 
Tree swallow, Tachycineta bicolor 
Bahama swallow, Tachycineta cyaneoviridis 
Violet-green swallow, Tachycineta thalassina 
Golden swallow, Tachycineta euchrysea 
Mangrove swallow, Tachycineta albilinea 
Black-capped swallow, Atticora pileata 
White-thighed swallow, Atticora tibialis 
Blue-and-white swallow, Pygochelidon cyanoleuca 
Northern rough-winged swallow, Stelgidopteryx serripennis 
Southern rough-winged swallow, Stelgidopteryx ruficollis 
Brown-chested martin, Progne tapera 
Purple martin, Progne subis 
Southern martin, Progne elegans 
Gray-breasted martin, Progne chalybea 
Sinaloa martin, Progne sinaloae 
Cuban martin, Progne cryptoleuca 
Caribbean martin, Progne dominicensis 
Barn swallow, Hirundo rustica 
Common house-martin, Delichon urbicum (A) 
Cliff swallow, Petrochelidon pyrrhonota 
Cave swallow, Petrochelidon fulva 

Tits, chickadees, and titmice
Order: PasseriformesFamily: Paridae

The Paridae are mainly small stocky woodland species with short stout bills. Some have crests. They are adaptable birds, with a mixed diet including seeds and insects.

Carolina chickadee, Poecile carolinensis 
Black-capped chickadee, Poecile atricapillus 
Mountain chickadee, Poecile gambeli 
Mexican chickadee, Poecile sclateri 
Chestnut-backed chickadee, Poecile rufescens 
Boreal chickadee, Poecile hudsonicus 
Gray-headed chickadee, Poecile cinctus 
Bridled titmouse, Baeolophus wollweberi 
Oak titmouse, Baeolophus inornatus 
Juniper titmouse, Baeolophus ridgwayi 
Tufted titmouse, Baeolophus bicolor 
Black-crested titmouse, Baeolophus atricristatus 

Penduline-tits
Order: PasseriformesFamily: Remizidae

The penduline-tits are a family of small passerine birds, related to the true tits. The verdin is the only North American representative of its family.

Verdin, Auriparus flaviceps 

Long-tailed tits
Order: PasseriformesFamily: Aegithalidae

The long-tailed tits are a family of small passerine birds. Their plumage is typically dull gray or brown in color. There is only one North American representative of this primarily Palearctic family.

Bushtit, Psaltriparus minimus 

Nuthatches
Order: PasseriformesFamily: Sittidae

Nuthatches are small woodland birds. They have the unusual ability to climb down trees head first, unlike other birds which can only go upwards. Nuthatches have big heads, short tails and powerful bills and feet.

Red-breasted nuthatch, Sitta canadensis 
White-breasted nuthatch, Sitta carolinensis 
Pygmy nuthatch, Sitta pygmaea 
Brown-headed nuthatch, Sitta pusilla 
Bahama nuthatch, Sitta insularis 

Treecreepers 
Order: PasseriformesFamily: Certhiidae

Treecreepers are small woodland birds, brown above and white below. They have thin pointed down-curved bills, which they use to extricate insects from bark. They have stiff tail feathers, like woodpeckers, which they use to support themselves on vertical trees.

Brown creeper, Certhia americana 

Wrens
Order: PasseriformesFamily: Troglodytidae

Wrens are small and inconspicuous birds, except for their loud songs. They have short wings and thin down-turned bills. Several species often hold their tails upright. All are insectivorous.

Rock wren, Salpinctes obsoletus 
Nightingale wren, Microcerculus philomela 
Scaly-breasted wren, Microcerculus marginatus 
Canyon wren, Catherpes mexicanus 
Sumichrast's wren, Hylorchilus sumichrasti 
Nava's wren, Hylorchilus navai 
Zapata wren, Ferminia cerverai 
House wren, Troglodytes aedon  (Guadeloupe wren T. a. guadeloupensis and Saint Lucia wren T. a. mesoleucus)
Socorro wren, Troglodytes sissonii 
Clarión wren, Troglodytes tanneri 
Rufous-browed wren, Troglodytes rufociliatus 
Ochraceous wren, Troglodytes ochraceus 
Pacific wren, Troglodytes pacificus 
Winter wren, Troglodytes hiemalis 
Timberline wren, Thryorchilus browni 
Sedge wren, Cistothorus stellaris 
Grass wren, Cistothorus platensis 
Marsh wren, Cistothorus palustris 
Carolina wren, Thryothorus ludovicianus 
Bewick's wren, Thryomanes bewickii 
White-headed wren, Campylorhynchus albobrunneus 
Band-backed wren, Campylorhynchus zonatus 
Gray-barred wren, Campylorhynchus megalopterus 
Giant wren, Campylorhynchus chiapensis 
Bicolored wren, Campylorhynchus griseus 
Rufous-naped wren, Campylorhynchus rufinucha 
Spotted wren, Campylorhynchus gularis 
Boucard's wren, Campylorhynchus jocosus 
Yucatan wren, Campylorhynchus yucatanicus 
Cactus wren, Campylorhynchus brunneicapillus 
Sooty-headed wren, Pheugopedius spadix 
Black-throated wren, Pheugopedius atrogularis 
Rufous-breasted wren, Pheugopedius rutilus 
Spot-breasted wren, Pheugopedius maculipectus 
Happy wren, Pheugopedius felix 
Black-bellied wren, Pheugopedius fasciatoventris 
Rufous-and-white wren, Thryophilus rufalbus 
Sinaloa wren Thryophilus sinaloa 
Banded wren, Thryophilus pleurostictus 
Stripe-throated wren, Cantorchilus leucopogon 
Stripe-breasted wren, Cantorchilus thoracicus 
Cabanis's wren, Cantorchilus modestus 
Canebrake wren, Cantorchilus zeledoni 
Isthmian wren, Cantorchilus elutusBay wren, Cantorchilus nigricapillus 
Riverside wren, Cantorchilus semibadius 
Buff-breasted wren, Cantorchilus leucotis 
White-bellied wren, Uropsila leucogastra 
White-breasted wood-wren, Henicorhina leucosticta 
Gray-breasted wood-wren, Henicorhina leucophrys 
Song wren, Cyphorhinus phaeocephalus 

Gnatcatchers
Order: PasseriformesFamily: Polioptilidae

These dainty birds resemble Old World warblers in their build and habits, moving restlessly through the foliage seeking insects. The gnatcatchers and gnatwrens are mainly soft bluish gray in color and have the typical insectivore's long sharp bill. They are birds of fairly open woodland or scrub, which nest in bushes or trees.

Tawny-faced gnatwren, Microbates cinereiventris 
Long-billed gnatwren, Ramphocaenus melanurus 
Blue-gray gnatcatcher, Polioptila caerulea 
Cuban gnatcatcher, Polioptila lembeyei 
California gnatcatcher, Polioptila californica 
Black-tailed gnatcatcher, Polioptila melanura 
Black-capped gnatcatcher, Polioptila nigriceps 
White-lored gnatcatcher, Polioptila albiloris 
Yucatan gnatcatcher, Polioptila albiventris 
White-browed gnatcatcher, Polioptila bilineata 
Slate-throated gnatcatcher, Polioptila schistaceigula 

Dippers
Order: PasseriformesFamily: Cinclidae

They are named for their bobbing or dipping movements. They are unique among passerines for their ability to dive and swim underwater.

American dipper, Cinclus mexicanus 

Bulbuls
Order: PasseriformesFamily: Pycnonotidae

The bulbuls are a family of medium-sized passerine songbirds native to Africa and tropical Asia. These are noisy and gregarious birds with often beautiful striking songs.

Red-whiskered bulbul Pycnonotus jocosus (I) 

Kinglets
Order: PasseriformesFamily: Regulidae

The kinglets are a small family of birds which resemble the titmice. They are very small insectivorous birds in the genus Regulus. The adults have colored crowns, giving rise to their name.

Golden-crowned kinglet, Regulus satrapa 
Ruby-crowned kinglet, Corthylio calendula 

Leaf warblers
Order: PasseriformesFamily: Phylloscopidae

Leaf warblers are a family of small insectivorous birds found mostly in Eurasia and ranging into Wallacea and Africa. The Arctic warbler breeds east into Alaska. The species are of various sizes, often green-plumaged above and yellow below, or more subdued with grayish-green to grayish-brown colors.

Willow warbler, Phylloscopus trochilus (A) 
Common chiffchaff, Phylloscopus collybita (A) 
Wood warbler, Phylloscopus sibilatrix (A) 
Dusky warbler, Phylloscopus fuscatus (A) 
Pallas's leaf warbler, Phylloscopus proregulus (A) 
Yellow-browed warbler, Phylloscopus inornatus (A) 
Arctic warbler, Phylloscopus borealis 
Kamchatka leaf warbler, Phylloscopus examinandus (A) 

Sylviid warblers, parrotbills, and allies
Order: PasseriformesFamily: Sylviidae

The family Sylviidae is a group of small insectivorous passerine birds. They mainly occur as breeding species, as the common name implies, in Europe, Asia and, to a lesser extent, Africa. Most are of generally undistinguished appearance, but many have distinctive songs.

Eurasian blackcap, Sylvia atricapilla (A) 
Lesser whitethroat, Sylvia curruca (A) 
Wrentit, Chamaea fasciata 

Reed warblers and allies
Order: PasseriformesFamily: Acrocephalidae

The members of this family are usually rather large for "warblers". Most are rather plain olivaceous brown above with much yellow to beige below. They are usually found in open woodland, reedbeds, or tall grass. The family occurs mostly in southern to western Eurasia and surroundings, but also ranges far into the Pacific, with some species in Africa.

Thick-billed warbler, Arundinax aedon (A) 
Sedge warbler, Acrocephalus schoenobaenus (A) 
Blyth's reed warbler, Acrocephalus dumetorum (A) 

Donacobius
Order: PasseriformesFamily: Donacobiidae

The black-capped donacobius is found in wet habitats from Panama across northern South America and east of the Andes to Argentina and Paraguay

Black-capped donacobius, Donacobius atricapilla 

Grassbirds and allies
Order: PasseriformesFamily: Locustellidae

Locustellidae are a family of small insectivorous songbirds found mainly in Eurasia, Africa, and the Australian region. They are smallish birds with tails that are usually long and pointed, and tend to be drab brownish or buffy all over.

Middendorff's grasshopper warbler, Helopsaltes ochotensis (A) 
Pallas's grasshopper warbler, Helopsaltes certhiola (A) 
Lanceolated warbler, Locustella lanceolata (A) 
River warbler, Locustella fluviatilis (A) 

Old World flycatchers
Order: PasseriformesFamily: Muscicapidae

This a large family of small passerine birds found mostly in the Old World. All but two of the species below occur in North America only as vagrants. The appearance of these birds is highly varied, but they mostly have weak songs and harsh calls.

Gray-streaked flycatcher, Muscicapa griseisticta (A) 
Asian brown flycatcher, Muscicapa dauurica (A) 
Spotted flycatcher, Muscicapa striata (A) 
Dark-sided flycatcher, Muscicapa sibirica (A) 
European robin, Erithacus rubecula (A) 
Siberian blue robin, Larvivora cyane (A) 
Rufous-tailed robin, Larvivora sibilans (A) 
Bluethroat, Cyanecula svecica 
Siberian rubythroat, Calliope calliope (A) 
Red-flanked bluetail, Tarsiger cyanurus (A) 
Narcissus flycatcher, Ficedula narcissina (A) 
Mugimaki flycatcher, Ficedula mugimaki (A) 
Taiga flycatcher, Ficedula albicilla (A) 
Common redstart, Phoenicurus phoenicurus (A) 
Siberian stonechat, Saxicola maurus (A) 
Northern wheatear, Oenanthe oenanthe 
Pied wheatear, Oenanthe pleschanka (A) 

Thrushes and allies

Order: PasseriformesFamily: Turdidae

The thrushes are a group of passerine birds that occur mainly but not exclusively in the Old World. They are plump, soft plumaged, small to medium-sized insectivores or sometimes omnivores, often feeding on the ground. Many have attractive songs.

Eastern bluebird, Sialia sialis 
Western bluebird, Sialia mexicana 
Mountain bluebird, Sialia currucoides 
Townsend's solitaire, Myadestes townsendi 
Brown-backed solitaire, Myadestes occidentalis 
Cuban solitaire, Myadestes elisabeth 
Rufous-throated solitaire, Myadestes genibarbis 
Black-faced solitaire, Myadestes melanops 
Varied solitaire, Myadestes coloratus 
Slate-colored solitaire, Myadestes unicolor 
White's thrush, Zoothera aurea (A) 
Black-billed nightingale-thrush, Catharus gracilirostris 
Orange-billed nightingale-thrush, Catharus aurantiirostris 
Slaty-backed nightingale-thrush, Catharus fuscater 
Russet nightingale-thrush, Catharus occidentalis 
Ruddy-capped nightingale-thrush, Catharus frantzii 
Black-headed nightingale-thrush, Catharus mexicanus 
Yellow-throated nightingale-thrush, Catharus dryas 
Veery, Catharus fuscescens 
Gray-cheeked thrush, Catharus minimus 
Bicknell's thrush, Catharus bicknelli 
Swainson's thrush, Catharus ustulatus 
Hermit thrush, Catharus guttatus 
Wood thrush, Hylocichla mustelina 
Mistle Thrush, Turdus viscivorus (A) 
Eurasian blackbird, Turdus merula (A) 
Eyebrowed thrush, Turdus obscurus 
Dusky thrush, Turdus eunomus (A) 
Naumann's thrush, Turdus naumanni (A) 
Fieldfare, Turdus pilaris 
Redwing, Turdus iliacus 
Song thrush, Turdus philomelos (A) 
Sooty thrush, Turdus nigrescens 
Black thrush, Turdus infuscatus 
Mountain thrush, Turdus plebejus 
Cocoa thrush, Turdus fumigatus 
Pale-vented thrush, Turdus obsoletus 
Clay-colored thrush, Turdus grayi 
Spectacled thrush, Turdus nudigenis 
White-eyed thrush, Turdus jamaicensis 
White-throated thrush, Turdus assimilis 
Rufous-backed robin, Turdus rufopalliatus 
Rufous-collared robin, Turdus rufitorques 
American robin, Turdus migratorius 
La Selle thrush, Turdus swalesi 
White-chinned thrush, Turdus aurantius 
Grand Cayman thrush, Turdus ravidus (E) 
Red-legged thrush, Turdus plumbeus 
Forest thrush, Cichlherminia lherminieri 
Varied thrush, Ixoreus naevius 
Aztec thrush, Ridgwayia pinicola 

Mockingbirds and thrashers
Order: PasseriformesFamily: Mimidae

The mimids are a family of passerine birds which includes thrashers, mockingbirds, tremblers and the New World catbirds. These birds are notable for their vocalization, especially their remarkable ability to mimic a wide variety of birds and other sounds heard outdoors. The species tend towards dull grays and browns in their appearance.

Blue mockingbird, Melanotis caerulescens 
Blue-and-white mockingbird, Melanotis hypoleucus 
Black catbird, Melanoptila glabrirostris 
Gray catbird, Dumetella carolinensis 
White-breasted thrasher, Ramphocinclus brachyurus  
Scaly-breasted thrasher, Allenia fusca 
Pearly-eyed thrasher, Margarops fuscatus 
Brown trembler, Cinclocerthia ruficauda 
Gray trembler, Cinclocerthia gutturalis 
Curve-billed thrasher, Toxostoma curvirostre 
Ocellated thrasher, Toxostoma ocellatum 
Brown thrasher, Toxostoma rufum 
Long-billed thrasher, Toxostoma longirostre 
Cozumel thrasher, Toxostoma guttatum 
Bendire's thrasher, Toxostoma bendirei 
Gray thrasher, Toxostoma cinereum 
California thrasher, Toxostoma redivivum 
LeConte's thrasher, Toxostoma lecontei 
Crissal thrasher, Toxostoma crissale 
Sage thrasher, Oreoscoptes montanus 
Bahama mockingbird, Mimus gundlachii 
Socorro mockingbird, Mimus graysoni  
Tropical mockingbird, Mimus gilvus 
Northern mockingbird, Mimus polyglottos 

Starlings
Order: PasseriformesFamily: Sturnidae

Starlings and mynas are small to medium-sized Old World passerine birds with strong feet. Their flight is strong and direct and most are very gregarious. Their preferred habitat is fairly open country, and they eat insects and fruit. The plumage of several species is dark with a metallic sheen.

European starling, Sturnus vulgaris (I) 
Common myna, Acridotheres tristis (I) 

Waxwings
Order: PasseriformesFamily: Bombycillidae

The waxwings are a group of birds with soft silky plumage and unique red tips to some of the wing feathers. In the Bohemian and cedar waxwings, these tips look like sealing wax and give the group its name. These are arboreal birds of northern forests. They live on insects in summer and berries in winter.

Bohemian waxwing, Bombycilla garrulus 
Cedar waxwing, Bombycilla cedrorum 

Silky-flycatchers
Order: PasseriformesFamily: Ptiliogonatidae

The silky-flycatchers are a small family of passerine birds which occur mainly in Central America. They are related to waxwings, and like that group, have soft silky plumage, usually gray or pale-yellow.

Black-and-yellow silky-flycatcher, Phainoptila melanoxantha 
Gray silky-flycatcher, Ptiliogonys cinereus 
Long-tailed silky-flycatcher, Ptiliogonys caudatus 
Phainopepla, Phainopepla nitens 

Palmchat
Order: PasseriformesFamily: Dulidae

The palmchat is the only member of its family. Its name indicates its strong association with palms for feeding, roosting, and nesting.

Palmchat, Dulus dominicus 

Olive warbler
Order: PasseriformesFamily: Peucedramidae

The olive warbler is the only representative of its family. It was formally classified with the Parulidae, but DNA studies warrant its classification in a distinct family.

Olive warbler, Peucedramus taeniatus 

Accentors
Order: PasseriformesFamily: Prunellidae

The accentors are small, fairly drab birds with thin sharp bills superficially similar, but unrelated to, sparrows. They are endemic to the Palearctic and only appear in North America as a vagrant.

Siberian accentor, Prunella montanella (A) 

Weavers and allies
Order: PasseriformesFamily: Ploceidae

The weavers are small passerine birds related to the finches. They are seed-eating birds with rounded conical bills. The males of many species are brightly colored, usually in red or yellow and black, though some species show variation in color only in the breeding season.

Village weaver, Ploceus cucullatus (I) 
Northern red bishop, Euplectes franciscanus (I) 
Yellow-crowned bishop, Euplectes afer (I) 

Indigobirds
Order: PasseriformesFamily: Viduidae

The indigobirds are finch-like species which usually have black or indigo predominating in their plumage. All are brood parasites, which lay their eggs in the nests of estrildid finches

Pin-tailed whydah, Vidua macroura (I) 

Waxbills and allies
Order: PasseriformesFamily: Estrildidae

The estrildid finches are small passerine birds native to the Old World tropics. They are gregarious and often colonial seed eaters with short thick but pointed bills. They are all similar in structure and habits, but have wide variation in plumage colors and patterns.

Orange-cheeked waxbill, Estrilda melpoda (I) 
Black-rumped waxbill, Estrilda troglodytes (I) 
Common waxbill, Estrilda astrild (I) 
Red avadavat, Amandava amandava (I) 
Bronze mannikin, Spermestes cucullata (I) 
Indian silverbill, Euodice malabarica (I) 
African silverbill, Euodice cantans (I) 
Java sparrow, Padda oryzivora (I) 
Scaly-breasted munia, Lonchura punctulata (I) 
Tricolored munia, Lonchura malacca (I) 
Chestnut munia, Lonchura atricapilla (I) 

Old World sparrows
Order: PasseriformesFamily: Passeridae

Old World sparrows are small passerine birds. In general, sparrows tend to be small plump brownish or grayish birds with short tails and short powerful beaks. Sparrows are seed eaters, but they also consume small insects.

House sparrow, Passer domesticus (I) 
Eurasian tree sparrow, Passer montanus (I) 

Wagtails and pipits
Order: PasseriformesFamily: Motacillidae

Motacillidae is a family of small passerine birds with medium to long tails. They include the wagtails, longclaws and pipits. They are slender, ground feeding insectivores of open country.

Eastern yellow wagtail, Motacilla tschutschensis  
Citrine wagtail, Motacilla citreola (A) 
Gray wagtail, Motacilla cinerea (A) 
White wagtail, Motacilla alba 
Tree pipit, Anthus trivialis (A) 
Olive-backed pipit, Anthus hodgsoni (A) 
Pechora pipit, Anthus gustavi (A) 
Red-throated pipit, Anthus cervinus 
American pipit, Anthus rubescens 
Meadow pipit, Anthus pratensis 
Sprague's pipit, Anthus spragueii 
Yellowish pipit, Anthus chii 

Finches, euphonias, and allies

Order: PasseriformesFamily: Fringillidae

Finches are seed-eating passerine birds, that are small to moderately large and have a strong beak, usually conical and in some species very large. All have twelve tail feathers and nine primaries. These birds have a bouncing flight with alternating bouts of flapping and gliding on closed wings, and most sing well.

Common chaffinch, Fringilla coelebs (A) 
Brambling, Fringilla montifringilla 
Yellow-collared chlorophonia, Chlorophonia flavirostris (A) 
Blue-crowned chlorophonia, Chlorophonia occipitalis 
Golden-browed chlorophonia, Chlorophonia callophrys 
Jamaican euphonia, Euphonia jamaica 
Scrub euphonia, Euphonia affinis 
West Mexican euphonia, Euphonia godmani 
Yellow-crowned euphonia, Euphonia luteicapilla 
Thick-billed euphonia, Euphonia laniirostris 
Yellow-throated euphonia, Euphonia hirundinacea 
Fulvous-vented euphonia, Euphonia fulvicrissa 
Spot-crowned euphonia, Euphonia imitans 
Olive-backed euphonia, Euphonia gouldi 
White-vented euphonia, Euphonia minuta 
Tawny-capped euphonia, Euphonia anneae 
Orange-bellied euphonia, Euphonia xanthogaster 
Antillean euphonia, Chlorophonia musica 
Elegant euphonia, Chlorophonia elegantissima 
Hooded grosbeak, Coccothraustes abeillei 
Evening grosbeak, Coccothraustes vespertinus 
Hawfinch, Coccothraustes coccothraustes (A) 
Common rosefinch, Carpodacus erythrinus 
Pallas's rosefinch, Carpodacus roseus (A) 
Pine grosbeak, Pinicola enucleator 
Eurasian bullfinch, Pyrrhula pyrrhula (A) 
Asian rosy-finch, (A) Leucosticte arctoa 
Gray-crowned rosy-finch, Leucosticte tephrocotis 
Black rosy-finch, Leucosticte atrata 
Brown-capped rosy-finch, Leucosticte australis 
House finch, Haemorhous mexicanus 
Purple finch, Haemorhous purpureus 
Cassin's finch, Haemorhous cassinii 
Oriental greenfinch, Chloris sinica (A) 
Yellow-fronted canary, Crithagra mozambicus (I) 
Common redpoll, Acanthis flammea 
Lesser redpoll, Acanthis cabaret (A) 
Hoary redpoll, Acanthis hornemanniRed crossbill, Loxia curvirostra 
Cassia crossbill, Loxia sinesciurisHispaniolan crossbill, Loxia megaplaga 
White-winged crossbill, Loxia leucoptera 
European goldfinch, Carduelis carduelis (I) 
Eurasian siskin, Spinus spinus (A) 
Pine siskin, Spinus pinus 
Black-capped siskin, Spinus atriceps 
Black-headed siskin, Spinus notata 
Yellow-bellied siskin, Spinus xanthogastra 
Red siskin, Spinus cucullata (I)  
Antillean siskin, Spinus dominicensis 
Lesser goldfinch, Spinus psaltria 
Lawrence's goldfinch, Spinus lawrencei 
American goldfinch, Spinus tristis 
Island canary, Serinus canaria (I) 

Longspurs and snow buntings
Order: PasseriformesFamily: Calcariidae

The Calcariidae are a group of passerine birds that have been traditionally grouped with the Emberizeridae (New World sparrows), but differ in a number of respects and are usually found in open grassy areas.

Lapland longspur, Calcarius lapponicus 
Chestnut-collared longspur, Calcarius ornatus 
Smith's longspur, Calcarius pictus 
Thick-billed longspur, Rhynchophanes mccownii 
Snow bunting, Plectrophenax nivalis 
McKay's bunting, Plectrophenax hyperboreus 

Thrush-tanager
Order: PasseriformesFamily: Rhodinocichlidae

This species was historically placed in family Thraupidae. It was placed in its own family in 2017.

Rosy thrush-tanager, Rhodinocichla rosea 

Old World buntings
Order: PasseriformesFamily: Emberizidae

Emberizidae is a family of passerine birds containing a single genus. Until 2017, the New World sparrows (Passerellidae) were also considered part of this family.

Pine bunting, Emberiza leucocephalos (A) 
Yellow-browed bunting, Emberiza chrysophrys (A) 
Little bunting, Emberiza pusilla (A) 
Rustic bunting, Emberiza rustica 
Yellow-throated bunting, Emberiza elegans (A) 
Yellow-breasted bunting, Emberiza aureola (A) 
Gray bunting, Emberiza variabilis (A) 
Pallas's bunting, Emberiza pallasi (A) 
Reed bunting, Emberiza schoeniclus (A) 

New World sparrows

Order: PasseriformesFamily: Passerellidae

Until 2017, these species were considered part of the family Emberizidae. Most of the species are known as sparrows, but these birds are not closely related to the Old World sparrows which are in the family Passeridae. Many of these have distinctive head patterns.

Yellow-throated chlorospingus, Chlorospingus flavigularis 
Ashy-throated chlorospingus, Chlorospingus canigularis 
Sooty-capped chlorospingus, Chlorospingus pileatus 
Common chlorospingus, Chlorospingus flavopectus 
Tacarcuna chlorospingus, Chlorospingus tacarcunae 
Pirre chlorospingus, Chlorospingus inornatus 
Rufous-winged sparrow, Peucaea carpalis 
Cinnamon-tailed sparrow, Peucaea sumichrasti 
Stripe-headed sparrow, Peucaea ruficauda 
Black-chested sparrow, Peucaea humeralis 
Bridled sparrow, Peucaea mystacalis 
Botteri's sparrow, Peucaea botterii 
Cassin's sparrow, Peucaea cassinii 
Bachman's sparrow, Peucaea aestivalis 
Grasshopper sparrow, Ammodramus savannarum 
Olive sparrow, Arremonops rufivirgatus 
Green-backed sparrow, Arremonops chloronotus 
Black-striped sparrow, Arremonops conirostris 
Five-striped sparrow, Amphispizopsis quinquestriata 
Black-throated sparrow, Amphispiza bilineata 
Lark sparrow, Chondestes grammacus 
Lark bunting, Calamospiza melanocorys 
Chipping sparrow, Spizella passerina 
Clay-colored sparrow, Spizella pallida 
Black-chinned sparrow, Spizella atrogularis 
Field sparrow, Spizella pusilla 
Brewer's sparrow, Spizella breweri 
Worthen's sparrow, Spizella wortheni 
Costa Rican brushfinch, Arremon costaricensis 
Black-headed brushfinch, Arremon atricapillus 
Orange-billed sparrow, Arremon aurantiirostris 
Green-striped brushfinch, Arremon virenticeps 
Chestnut-capped brushfinch Arremon brunneinucha 
Sooty-faced finch, Arremon crassirostris 
Fox sparrow, Passerella iliaca 
American tree sparrow, Spizelloides arborea 
Volcano junco, Junco vulcani 
Guadalupe junco, Junco insularis 
Dark-eyed junco, Junco hyemalis 
Yellow-eyed junco, Junco phaeonotus 
Baird's junco, Junco bairdi 
Rufous-collared sparrow, Zonotrichia capensis 
White-crowned sparrow, Zonotrichia leucophrys 
Golden-crowned sparrow, Zonotrichia atricapilla 
Harris's sparrow, Zonotrichia querula 
White-throated sparrow, Zonotrichia albicollis 
Sagebrush sparrow, Artemisiospiza nevadensis 
Bell's sparrow, Artemisiospiza belli 
Striped sparrow, Oriturus superciliosus 
Vesper sparrow, Pooecetes gramineus 
Le Conte's sparrow, Ammospiza leconteii 
Seaside sparrow, Ammospiza maritima  (Cape Sable seaside sparrow A. m. mirabilis)
Nelson's sparrow, Ammospiza nelsoni 
Saltmarsh sparrow, Ammospiza caudacuta 
Baird's sparrow, Centronyx bairdii 
Henslow's sparrow, Centronyx henslowii 
Savannah sparrow, Passerculus sandwichensis 
Sierra Madre sparrow, Xenospiza baileyi 
Song sparrow, Melospiza melodia 
Lincoln's sparrow, Melospiza lincolnii 
Swamp sparrow, Melospiza georgiana 
Large-footed finch, Pezopetes capitalis 
Zapata sparrow, Torreornis inexpectata 
Rusty-crowned ground-sparrow, Melozone kieneri 
Canyon towhee, Melozone fusca 
White-throated towhee, Melozone albicollis 
Abert's towhee, Melozone aberti 
California towhee, Melozone crissalis 
White-eared ground-sparrow, Melozone leucotis 
White-faced ground-sparrow, Melozone biarcuata 
Cabanis's ground-sparrow, Melozone cabanisi 
Rusty sparrow, Aimophila rufescens 
Rufous-crowned sparrow, Aimophila ruficeps 
Oaxaca sparrow, Aimophila notosticta 
Green-tailed towhee, Pipilo chlorurus 
Spotted towhee, Pipilo maculatus 
Eastern towhee, Pipilo erythrophthalmus 
Collared towhee, Pipilo ocai 
Rufous-capped brushfinch, Atlapetes pileatus 
White-naped brushfinch, Atlapetes albinucha 
Yellow-thighed brushfinch, Atlapetes tibialis 
Yellow-green brushfinch, Atlapetes luteoviridis 

Chat-tanagers
Order: PasseriformesFamily: Calyptophilidae

These two species were formerly classified as tanagers (family Thraupidae) but were placed in their own family in 2017.

Western chat-tanager, Calyptophilus tertius 
Eastern chat-tanager, Calyptophilus frugivorus 

Hispaniolan tanagers
Order: PasseriformesFamily: Phaenicophilidae

The members of this small family were formerly classified as tanagers and New World warblers (family Parulidae) but were placed in their own family in 2017.

Black-crowned palm-tanager, Phaenicophilus palmarum 
Gray-crowned palm-tanager, Phaenicophilus poliocephalus 
White-winged warbler, Xenoligea montana 
Green-tailed warbler, Microligea palustris 

Puerto Rican tanager
Order: PasseriformesFamily: Nesospingidae

This species was formerly classified as a tanager (family Thraupidae) but was placed in its own family in 2017.

Puerto Rican tanager, Nesospingus speculiferus 

Spindalises
Order: PasseriformesFamily: Spindalidae

The members of this small family are native to the Greater Antilles. They were formerly classified as tanagers but were placed in their own family in 2017.

Western spindalis, Spindalis zena 
Jamaican spindalis, Spindalis nigricephala 
Hispaniolan spindalis, Spindalis dominicensis 
Puerto Rican spindalis, Spindalis portoricensis 

Wrenthrush
Order: PasseriformesFamily: Zeledoniidae

Despite its name, this species is neither a wren nor a thrush, and is not closely related to either family. It was moved from the wood-warblers (Parulidae) and placed in its own family in 2017.

Wrenthrush, Zeledonia coronata 

Cuban warblers

Order: PasseriformesFamily: Teretistridae

These two species were formerly placed in the New World warblers (Parulidae) but were moved to their own family in 2017.

Yellow-headed warbler, Teretistris fernandinae 
Oriente warbler, Teretistris fornsi 

Yellow-breasted chat
Order: PasseriformesFamily: Icteriidae

This species was historically placed in the wood-warblers but nonetheless most authorities were unsure if it belonged there. It was placed in its own family in 2017.

 Yellow-breasted chat, Icteria virens 

Troupials and allies

Order: PasseriformesFamily: Icteridae

The icterids are a group of small to medium-sized, often colorful passerine birds restricted to the New World and include the grackles, New World blackbirds and New World orioles. Most species have black as a predominant plumage color, often enlivened by yellow, orange or red.

Yellow-headed blackbird, Xanthocephalus xanthocephalus 
Bobolink, Dolichonyx oryzivorus 
Eastern meadowlark, Sturnella magna 
Western meadowlark, Sturnella neglecta 
Chihuahuan meadowlark, Sturnella lilianae 
Red-breasted meadowlark, Leistes militaris 
Yellow-billed cacique, Amblycercus holosericeus 
Yellow-winged cacique, Cassiculus melanicterus 
Crested oropendola, Psarocolius decumanus 
Chestnut-headed oropendola, Psarocolius wagleri 
Montezuma oropendola, Psarocolius montezuma 
Black oropendola, Psarocolius guatimozinus 
Scarlet-rumped cacique, Cacicus uropygialis 
Yellow-rumped cacique, Cacicus cela 
Bahama oriole, Icterus northropi 
Cuban oriole, Icterus melanopsis 
Hispaniolan oriole, Icterus dominicensis 
Puerto Rican oriole, Icterus portoricensis 
St. Lucia oriole, Icterus laudabilis 
Montserrat oriole, Icterus oberi 
Martinique oriole, Icterus bonana 
Black-vented oriole, Icterus wagleri 
Bar-winged oriole, Icterus maculialatus 
Black-cowled oriole, Icterus prosthemelas 
Orchard oriole, Icterus spurius 
Hooded oriole, Icterus cucullatus 
Yellow-backed oriole, Icterus chrysater 
Orange-crowned oriole, Icterus auricapillus 
Yellow-tailed oriole, Icterus mesomelas 
Venezuelan troupial, Icterus icterus  (I)
Streak-backed oriole, Icterus pustulatus 
Bullock's oriole, Icterus bullockii 
Orange oriole, Icterus auratus 
Jamaican oriole, Icterus leucopteryx 
Spot-breasted oriole, Icterus pectoralis (I) 
Altamira oriole, Icterus gularis 
Audubon's oriole, Icterus graduacauda 
Baltimore oriole, Icterus galbula 
Black-backed oriole, Icterus abeillei 
Scott's oriole, Icterus parisorum 
Jamaican blackbird, Nesopsar nigerrimus 
Red-winged blackbird, Agelaius phoeniceus 
Red-shouldered blackbird, Agelaius assimilis 
Tricolored blackbird, Agelaius tricolor 
Tawny-shouldered blackbird, Agelaius humeralis 
Yellow-shouldered blackbird, Agelaius xanthomus  
Shiny cowbird, Molothrus bonariensis 
Bronzed cowbird, Molothrus aeneus 
Brown-headed cowbird, Molothrus ater 
Giant cowbird, Molothrus oryzivorus 
Melodious blackbird, Dives dives 
Cuban blackbird, Ptiloxena atroviolacea 
Rusty blackbird, Euphagus carolinus 
Brewer's blackbird, Euphagus cyanocephalus 
Common grackle, Quiscalus quiscula 
Boat-tailed grackle, Quiscalus major 
Great-tailed grackle, Quiscalus mexicanus 
Slender-billed grackle, Quiscalus palustris (E)  
Nicaraguan grackle, Quiscalus nicaraguensis 
Greater Antillean grackle, Quiscalus niger 
Carib grackle, Quiscalus lugubris }
Yellow-hooded blackbird, Chrysomus icterocephalus  

New World warblers

Order: PasseriformesFamily: Parulidae

The wood warblers are a group of small often colorful passerine birds restricted to the New World. Most are arboreal, but some are more terrestrial. Most members of this family are insectivores. In August 2011, the North American Committee of the AOS changed their classification of many of the wood warblers. Since this list is based on the AOS classification, changes to scientific names are updated here.

Ovenbird, Seiurus aurocapilla 
Worm-eating warbler, Helmitheros vermivorus 
Louisiana waterthrush, Parkesia motacilla 
Northern waterthrush, Parkesia noveboracensis 
Bachman's warbler, Vermivora bachmanii (E?)  
Golden-winged warbler, Vermivora chrysoptera 
Blue-winged warbler, Vermivora cyanoptera 
Black-and-white warbler, Mniotilta varia 
Prothonotary warbler, Protonotaria citrea 
Swainson's warbler, Limnothlypis swainsonii 
Crescent-chested warbler, Oreothlypis superciliosa 
Flame-throated warbler, Oreothlypis gutturalis 
Tennessee warbler, Leiothlypis peregrina 
Orange-crowned warbler, Leiothlypis celata 
Colima warbler, Leiothlypis crissalis 
Lucy's warbler, Leiothlypis luciae 
Nashville warbler, Leiothlypis ruficapilla 
Virginia's warbler, Leiothlypis virginiae 
Semper's warbler, Leucopeza semperi  
Connecticut warbler, Oporornis agilis 
Gray-crowned yellowthroat, Geothlypis poliocephala 
MacGillivray's warbler, Geothlypis tolmiei 
Mourning warbler, Geothlypis philadelphia 
Kentucky warbler, Geothlypis formosa 
Olive-crowned yellowthroat, Geothlypis semiflava 
Black-polled yellowthroat, Geothlypis speciosa 
Belding's yellowthroat, Geothlypis beldingi 
Bahama yellowthroat, Geothlypis rostrata 
Altamira yellowthroat, Geothlypis flavovelata 
Common yellowthroat, Geothlypis trichas 
Hooded yellowthroat, Geothlypis nelsoni 
Whistling warbler, Catharopeza bishopi 
Plumbeous warbler, Setophaga plumbea 
Elfin-woods warbler, Setophaga angelae 
Arrowhead warbler, Setophaga pharetra 
Hooded warbler, Setophaga citrina 
American redstart, Setophaga ruticilla 
Kirtland's warbler, Setophaga kirtlandii  
Cape May warbler, Setophaga tigrina 
Cerulean warbler, Setophaga cerulea 
Northern parula, Setophaga americana 
Tropical parula, Setophaga pitiayumi 
Magnolia warbler, Setophaga magnolia 
Bay-breasted warbler, Setophaga castanea 
Blackburnian warbler, Setophaga fusca 
Yellow warbler, Setophaga petechia 
Chestnut-sided warbler, Setophaga pensylvanica 
Blackpoll warbler, Setophaga striata 
Black-throated blue warbler, Setophaga caerulescens 
Palm warbler, Setophaga palmarum 
Olive-capped warbler, Setophaga pityophila 
Pine warbler, Setophaga pinus  
Yellow-rumped warbler, Setophaga coronata 
Yellow-throated warbler, Setophaga dominica 
Bahama warbler, Setophaga flavescens 
Vitelline warbler, Setophaga vitellina 
Prairie warbler, Setophaga discolor 
Adelaide's warbler, Setophaga adelaidae 
Barbuda warbler, Setophaga subita 
St. Lucia warbler, Setophaga delicata 
Grace's warbler, Setophaga graciae 
Black-throated gray warbler, Setophaga nigrescens 
Townsend's warbler, Setophaga townsendi 
Hermit warbler, Setophaga occidentalis 
Golden-cheeked warbler, Setophaga chrysoparia  
Black-throated green warbler, Setophaga virens 
Buff-rumped warbler, Myiothlypis fulvicauda 
Fan-tailed warbler, Basileuterus lachrymosus 
Rufous-capped warbler, Basileuterus rufifrons 
Chestnut-capped warbler, Basileuterus delattrii 
Black-cheeked warbler, Basileuterus melanogenys 
Pirre warbler, Basileuterus ignotus 
Golden-browed warbler, Basileuterus belli 
Golden-crowned warbler, Basileuterus culicivorus 
Costa Rican warbler, Basileuterus  melanotisTacarcuna warbler, Basileuterus tacarcunaeCanada warbler, Cardellina canadensis 
Wilson's warbler, Cardellina pusilla 
Red-faced warbler, Cardellina rubrifrons 
Red warbler, Cardellina rubra 
Pink-headed warbler, Cardellina versicolor 
Painted redstart, Myioborus pictus 
Slate-throated redstart, Myioborus miniatus 
Collared redstart, Myioborus torquatus 

Mitrospingid tanagers
Order: PasseriformesFamily: Mitrospingidae

The members of this small family were previously included in Thraupidae ("true" tanagers). They were placed in this new family in 2017.

 Dusky-faced tanager, Mitrospingus cassinii 

Cardinals and allies

Order: PasseriformesFamily: Cardinalidae

The cardinals are a family of robust, seed-eating birds with strong bills. They are typically associated with open woodland. The sexes usually have distinct plumages.

Rose-throated tanager, Piranga roseogularis 
Hepatic tanager, Piranga flava 
Summer tanager, Piranga rubra 
Scarlet tanager, Piranga olivacea 
Western tanager, Piranga ludoviciana 
Flame-colored tanager, Piranga bidentata 
White-winged tanager, Piranga leucoptera 
Red-headed tanager, Piranga erythrocephala 
Red-crowned ant-tanager, Habia rubica 
Red-throated ant-tanager, Habia fuscicauda 
Black-cheeked ant-tanager, Habia atrimaxillaris 
Carmiol's tanager, Chlorothraupis carmioliLemon-spectacled tanager, Chlorothraupis olivacea 
Black-faced grosbeak, Caryothraustes poliogaster 
Yellow-green grosbeak, Caryothraustes canadensis 
Crimson-collared grosbeak, Rhodothraupis celaeno 
Northern cardinal, Cardinalis cardinalis 
Pyrrhuloxia, Cardinalis sinuatus 
Yellow grosbeak, Pheucticus chrysopeplus 
Black-thighed grosbeak, Pheucticus tibialis 
Rose-breasted grosbeak, Pheucticus ludovicianus 
Black-headed grosbeak, Pheucticus melanocephalus 
Red-breasted chat, Granatellus venustus 
Gray-throated chat, Granatellus sallaei 
Blue seedeater, Amaurospiza concolor 
Blue-black grosbeak, Cyanoloxia cyanoides 
Blue bunting, Cyanocompsa parellina 
Blue grosbeak, Passerina caerulea 
Lazuli bunting, Passerina amoena 
Indigo bunting, Passerina cyanea 
Rose-bellied bunting, Passerina rositae 
Orange-breasted bunting, Passerina leclancherii 
Varied bunting, Passerina versicolor 
Painted bunting, Passerina ciris 
Dickcissel, Spiza americana 

Tanagers and allies
Order: PasseriformesFamily: Thraupidae

The tanagers are a large group of small to medium-sized passerine birds restricted to the New World, mainly in the tropics. Many species are brightly colored. They are seed eaters, but their preference tends towards fruit and nectar. Most have short, rounded wings.

Blue-and-gold tanager, Bangsia arcaei 
Speckled tanager, Ixothraupis guttata 
Gray-and-gold tanager, Poecilostreptus palmeri 
Azure-rumped tanager, Poecilostreptus cabanisi 
Blue-gray tanager, Thraupis episcopus 
Yellow-winged tanager, Thraupis abbas 
Palm tanager Thraupis palmarum 
Golden-hooded tanager, Stilpnia larvata 
Lesser Antillean tanager, Stilpnia cucullata 
Green-naped tanager, Tangara fucosa 
Spangle-cheeked tanager, Tangara dowii 
Plain-colored tanager, Tangara inornata 
Rufous-winged tanager, Tangara lavinia 
Bay-headed tanager, Tangara gyrola 
Emerald tanager, Tangara florida 
Silver-throated tanager, Tangara icterocephala 
White-eared conebill, Conirostrum leucogenys 
Saffron finch, Sicalis flaveola (I) 
Grassland yellow-finch, Sicalis luteola 
Slaty finch, Haplospiza rustica 
Peg-billed finch, Acanthidops bairdi 
Cinnamon-bellied flowerpiercer, Diglossa baritula 
Slaty flowerpiercer, Diglossa plumbea 
Green honeycreeper, Chlorophanes spiza 
Black-and-yellow tanager, Chrysothlypis chrysomelas 
Sulphur-rumped tanager, Heterospingus rubrifrons 
Scarlet-browed tanager, Heterospingus xanthopygius 
Yellow-backed tanager, Hemithraupis flavicollis 
Blue-black grassquit, Volatinia jacarina 
Gray-headed tanager, Eucometis penicillata 
White-shouldered tanager, Loriotus luctuosus 
Tawny-crested tanager, Tachyphonus delatrii 
White-lined tanager, Tachyphonus rufus 
Black-throated shrike-tanager, Lanio aurantius 
White-throated shrike-tanager, Lanio leucothorax 
Crimson-collared tanager, Ramphocelus sanguinolentus 
Flame-rumped tanager, Ramphocelus flammigerus 
Scarlet-rumped tanager, Ramphocelus passerinii 
Crimson-backed tanager, Ramphocelus dimidiatus 
Swallow tanager, Tersina viridis 
Shining honeycreeper, Cyanerpes lucidus 
Purple honeycreeper, Cyanerpes caeruleus 
Red-legged honeycreeper, Cyanerpes cyaneus 
Scarlet-thighed dacnis, Dacnis venusta 
Blue dacnis, Dacnis cayana 
Viridian dacnis, Dacnis viguieri 
Bananaquit, Coereba flaveola 
Yellow-faced grassquit, Tiaris olivaceus 
Orangequit, Euneornis campestris 
Puerto Rican bullfinch, Melopyrrha portoricensis 
St. Kitts bullfinch, Melopyrrha grandisCuban bullfinch, Melopyrrha nigra 
Greater Antillean bullfinch, Melopyrrha violacea 
Yellow-shouldered grassquit, Loxipasser anoxanthus 
Cuban grassquit, Phonipara canora 
Lesser Antillean bullfinch, Loxigilla noctis 
Barbados bullfinch, Loxigilla barbadensis 
Black-faced grassquit, Melanospiza bicolor 
St. Lucia black finch, Melanospiza richardsoni 
Cocos finch, Pinaroloxias inornata 
Lined seedeater, Sporophila lineola 
Thick-billed seed-finch, Sporophila funerea 
Large-billed seed-finch, Sporophila crassirostris 
Nicaraguan seed-finch, Sporophila nuttingi 
Variable seedeater, Sporophila corvina 
Slate-colored seedeater, Sporophila schistacea 
Cinnamon-rumped seedeater, Sporophila torqueola 
Morelet's seedeater, Sporophila morelleti 
Yellow-bellied seedeater, Sporophila nigricollis 
Ruddy-breasted seedeater, Sporophila minuta 
Wedge-tailed grass-finch, Emberizoides herbicola 
Black-headed saltator, Saltator atriceps 
Buff-throated saltator, Saltator maximus 
Slate-colored grosbeak, Saltator grossus 
Lesser Antillean saltator, Saltator albicollis 
Cinnamon-bellied saltator, Saltator grandis 
Streaked saltator, Saltator striatipectus''

See also
Lists of birds by region
List of mammals of Mexico
List of North American reptiles
List of North American amphibians

References

External links 
Guide to North American Birds - National Audubon Society

 01
North America